= Communes of the Val-de-Marne department =

This page lists the 47 communes of the Val-de-Marne department of France on 1 January 2021. Since January 2016, all communes of the department are part of the intercommunality Métropole du Grand Paris.

== List of communes ==
List of the 47 communes in the Val-de-Marne department on 1 January 2021.
Name	Code INSEE	Postal code	Arrondissement	Canton	Intercommunality	Area (km^{2})	Population (2019)	Density (per km^{2})
Ablon-sur-Seine	94001	94480	L'Haÿ-les-Roses	Orly	Métropole du Grand Paris	1.11	5,852	5,272
Alfortville	94002	94140	Créteil	Alfortville	Métropole du Grand Paris	3.67	44,805	12,208
Arcueil	94003	94110	L'Haÿ-les-Roses	Cachan	Métropole du Grand Paris	2.33	21,788	9,351
Boissy-Saint-Léger	94004	94470	Créteil	Plateau briard	Métropole du Grand Paris	8.94	16,977	1,899
Bonneuil-sur-Marne	94011	94380	Créteil	Saint-Maur-des-Fossés-2	Métropole du Grand Paris	5.51	18,062	3,278
Bry-sur-Marne	94015	94360	Nogent-sur-Marne	Villiers-sur-Marne	Métropole du Grand Paris	3.35	17,525	5,231
Cachan	94016	94230	L'Haÿ-les-Roses	Cachan	Métropole du Grand Paris	2.74	30,440	11,109
Champigny-sur-Marne	94017	94500	Nogent-sur-Marne	Champigny-sur-Marne-1 Champigny-sur-Marne-2	Métropole du Grand Paris	11.30	76,990	6,813
Charenton-le-Pont	94018	94220	Nogent-sur-Marne	Charenton-le-Pont	Métropole du Grand Paris	1.85	29,882	16,152
Chennevières-sur-Marne	94019	94430	Créteil	Champigny-sur-Marne-2	Métropole du Grand Paris	5.27	18,039	3,423
Chevilly-Larue	94021	94550	L'Haÿ-les-Roses	Thiais	Métropole du Grand Paris	4.22	19,988	4,736
Choisy-le-Roi	94022	94600	L'Haÿ-les-Roses	Choisy-le-Roi	Métropole du Grand Paris	5.43	46,150	8,499
Créteil(Prefecture)	94028	94000	Créteil	Créteil-1 Créteil-2	Métropole du Grand Paris	11.46	93,246	8,137
Fontenay-sous-Bois	94033	94120	Nogent-sur-Marne	Fontenay-sous-Bois	Métropole du Grand Paris	5.58	52,008	9,320
Fresnes	94034	94260	L'Haÿ-les-Roses	L'Haÿ-les-Roses	Métropole du Grand Paris	3.56	28,710	8,065
Gentilly	94037	94250	L'Haÿ-les-Roses	Le Kremlin-Bicêtre	Métropole du Grand Paris	1.18	18,815	15,945
L'Haÿ-les-Roses	94038	94240	L'Haÿ-les-Roses	L'Haÿ-les-Roses	Métropole du Grand Paris	3.90	32,071	8,223
Ivry-sur-Seine	94041	94200	L'Haÿ-les-Roses	Ivry-sur-Seine	Métropole du Grand Paris	6.10	63,748	10,450
Joinville-le-Pont	94042	94340	Nogent-sur-Marne	Charenton-le-Pont	Métropole du Grand Paris	2.30	19,652	8,544
Le Kremlin-Bicêtre	94043	94270	L'Haÿ-les-Roses	Le Kremlin-Bicêtre	Métropole du Grand Paris	1.54	24,971	16,215
Limeil-Brévannes	94044	94450	Créteil	Villeneuve-Saint-Georges	Métropole du Grand Paris	6.93	27,833	4,016
Maisons-Alfort	94046	94700	Nogent-sur-Marne	Maisons-Alfort	Métropole du Grand Paris	5.35	56,483	10,558
Mandres-les-Roses	94047	94520	Créteil	Plateau briard	Métropole du Grand Paris	3.30	4,777	1,448
Marolles-en-Brie	94048	94440	Créteil	Plateau briard	Métropole du Grand Paris	4.59	4,783	1,042
Nogent-sur-Marne	94052	94130	Nogent-sur-Marne	Charenton-le-Pont Nogent-sur-Marne	Métropole du Grand Paris	2.80	34,042	12,158
Noiseau	94053	94880	Créteil	Plateau briard	Métropole du Grand Paris	4.49	4,607	1,026
Orly	94054	94310	L'Haÿ-les-Roses	Orly	Métropole du Grand Paris	6.69	24,627	3,681
Ormesson-sur-Marne	94055	94490	Créteil	Saint-Maur-des-Fossés-2	Métropole du Grand Paris	3.41	10,419	3,055
Périgny	94056	94520	Créteil	Plateau briard	Métropole du Grand Paris	2.79	2,688	963
Le Perreux-sur-Marne	94058	94170	Nogent-sur-Marne	Nogent-sur-Marne	Métropole du Grand Paris	3.96	33,588	8,482
Le Plessis-Trévise	94059	94420	Créteil	Villiers-sur-Marne	Métropole du Grand Paris	4.32	19,829	4,590
La Queue-en-Brie	94060	94510	Créteil	Plateau briard	Métropole du Grand Paris	9.16	12,051	1,316
Rungis	94065	94150	L'Haÿ-les-Roses	Thiais	Métropole du Grand Paris	4.20	5,657	1,347
Saint-Mandé	94067	94160	Nogent-sur-Marne	Vincennes	Métropole du Grand Paris	0.92	22,377	24,323
Saint-Maur-des-Fossés	94068	94100 94210	Nogent-sur-Marne	Saint-Maur-des-Fossés-1 Saint-Maur-des-Fossés-2	Métropole du Grand Paris	11.25	74,976	6,665
Saint-Maurice	94069	94410	Nogent-sur-Marne	Charenton-le-Pont	Métropole du Grand Paris	1.43	14,189	9,922
Santeny	94070	94440	Créteil	Plateau briard	Métropole du Grand Paris	9.91	4,014	405
Sucy-en-Brie	94071	94370	Créteil	Saint-Maur-des-Fossés-2	Métropole du Grand Paris	10.43	27,157	2,604
Thiais	94073	94320	L'Haÿ-les-Roses	Thiais	Métropole du Grand Paris	6.43	30,676	4,771
Valenton	94074	94460	L'Haÿ-les-Roses	Villeneuve-Saint-Georges	Métropole du Grand Paris	5.31	14,883	2,803
Villecresnes	94075	94440	Créteil	Plateau briard	Métropole du Grand Paris	5,62	11,779	2,096
Villejuif	94076	94800	L'Haÿ-les-Roses	Villejuif	Métropole du Grand Paris	5.34	55,208	10,339
Villeneuve-Saint-Georges	94078	94190	L'Haÿ-les-Roses	Choisy-le-Roi Villeneuve-Saint-Georges	Métropole du Grand Paris	8.75	34,890	3,987
Villeneuve-le-Roi	94077	94290	L'Haÿ-les-Roses	Orly	Métropole du Grand Paris	8.40	21,679	2,581
Villiers-sur-Marne	94079	94350	Nogent-sur-Marne	Villiers-sur-Marne	Métropole du Grand Paris	4.33	28,895	6,673
Vincennes	94080	94300	Nogent-sur-Marne	Fontenay-sous-Bois Vincennes	Métropole du Grand Paris	1.91	49,788	26,067
Vitry-sur-Seine	94081	94400	L'Haÿ-les-Roses	Vitry-sur-Seine-1 Vitry-sur-Seine-2	Métropole du Grand Paris	11.67	95,510	8,184
Val-de-Marne	94					245	1,407,124	5,743
