= Cantons of the Val-de-Marne department =

The following is a list of the 25 cantons of the Val-de-Marne department, in France, following the French canton reorganisation which came into effect in March 2015:

- Alfortville
- Cachan
- Champigny-sur-Marne-1
- Champigny-sur-Marne-2
- Charenton-le-Pont
- Choisy-le-Roi
- Créteil-1
- Créteil-2
- Fontenay-sous-Bois
- L'Haÿ-les-Roses
- Ivry-sur-Seine
- Le Kremlin-Bicêtre
- Maisons-Alfort
- Nogent-sur-Marne
- Orly
- Plateau briard
- Saint-Maur-des-Fossés-1
- Saint-Maur-des-Fossés-2
- Thiais
- Villejuif
- Villeneuve-Saint-Georges
- Villiers-sur-Marne
- Vincennes
- Vitry-sur-Seine-1
- Vitry-sur-Seine-2
