= Departmental Council of Val-de-Marne =

Departmental Council of Val-de-Marne Conseil départemental du Val-de-Marne

Type
- Type: Departmental council

Leadership
- President: Olivier Capitanio, The Republicans

Structure
- Seats: 50
- Political groups: Free and Independent Republicans (24) Val-de-Marne en commun – PCF & Citizens (11) Socialists (7) UDI & Affiliates (4) Ecologists and Citizens (3) Non-Attached (1)

Meeting place
- Créteil

Website
- www.valdemarne.fr

The Departmental Council of Val-de-Marne (French: Conseil Départemental du Val-de-Marne) is the deliberative assembly of the Val-de-Marne department in the region of Île-de-France. It consists of 50 members (general councilors) from 25 cantons and its headquarters are in Créteil.

The President of the General Council is Olivier Capitanio.

== List of presidents ==
Period		Name	Affiliation		Role
List of successive presidents of the General Council
1968	1970	Gaston Viens	French Communist Party	PCF	General Councillor for Canton of Orly (1967 → 2001); Mayor of Orly (1965 → 2009)
1970	1976	Roland Nungesser	Union of Democrats for the Republic	UDR	Former Minister; General Councillor for Canton of Nogent-sur-Marne (1967 → 1988); Mayor of Nogent-sur-Marne (1959 → 1995); Deputy of the Seine (1958 → 1966) and of Val-de-Marne (1968 → 1997)
1976	2001	Michel Germa	French Communist Party	PCF	Printer-typographer worker General Councillor for Canton of Vitry-sur-Seine-East (1967 → 2001)
2001	2015	Christian Favier	French Communist Party	PCF	Primary school teacher General Councillor for Canton of Champigny-sur-Marne-West (1994 → 2015); Senator of Val-de-Marne (2011 → 2017)
2021	present	Olivier Capitanio	The Republicans (France)|	LR	Executive, former parliamentary assistant to Michel Herbillon; Mayor (2017 → 2021), then Deputy Mayor of Maisons-Alfort; General Councillor for Canton of Maisons-Alfort-North (2004 → 2015); Departmental Councillor for Canton of Maisons-Alfort (2015 → ) President of the EPT Paris-Est-Marne et Bois (2020 → )

== Vice-presidents ==
The president of the Departmental Council is assisted by 15 vice-presidents chosen from the departmental advisers.

List of vice-presidents of the Val-de-Marne Departmental Council (as of 2021)
Order	Name	Canton	Charge(s)
1st	Paul Bazin	Nogent-sur-Marne	Medical demography and autonomy (elderly and disabled)
2nd	Françoise Lecoufle	Villeneuve-Saint-Georges	Roadways and navigable infrastructures
3rd	Michel Duvaudier	Champigny-sur-Marne-1	Habitat, housing and city policy
4th	Odile Séguret	Vincennes	Autonomy of the elderly and people with disabilities
5th	Hervé Gicquel	Charenton-le-Pont	Finance, public procurement, evaluation of public policies and digital development
6th	Marie-Christine Ségui	Saint-Maur-des-Fossés-2	Prevention and protection of children and adolescents and of International Cooperation
7th	Nicolas Tryzna	Thiais	Colleges, youth, educational success, school catering, higher education and research
8th	Laurence Coulon	Saint-Maur-des-Fossés-1	European and heritage affairs and relations with associated organizations
9th	Julien Weil	Vincennes	Human resources and legal affairs
10th	Déborah Münzer	Nogent-sur-Marne	Culture, community life, artistic and cultural education and tourism
11th	Jean-Pierre Barnaud	Champigny-sur-Marne-2	Environmental heritage, biodiversity, urban agriculture and animal welfare
12th	Chantal Durand	Charenton-le-Pont	Water and sanitation
13th	Tonino Panetta	Choisy-le-Roi	Professional integration, training, development of social and solidarity economy and active solidarity income
14th	Patricia Korchef-Lambert	Thiais	Sports
15th	Jean-Daniel Amsler	Saint-Maur-des-Fossés-2	Transport and traffic and veterans

== See also ==
- Val-de-Marne
- General councils of France
- Departmental Council of Val-de-Marne (official website)
