= Arrondissement of Créteil =

Coordinates: 48°46′58″N 2°27′12″E

Créteil
- Arrondissement
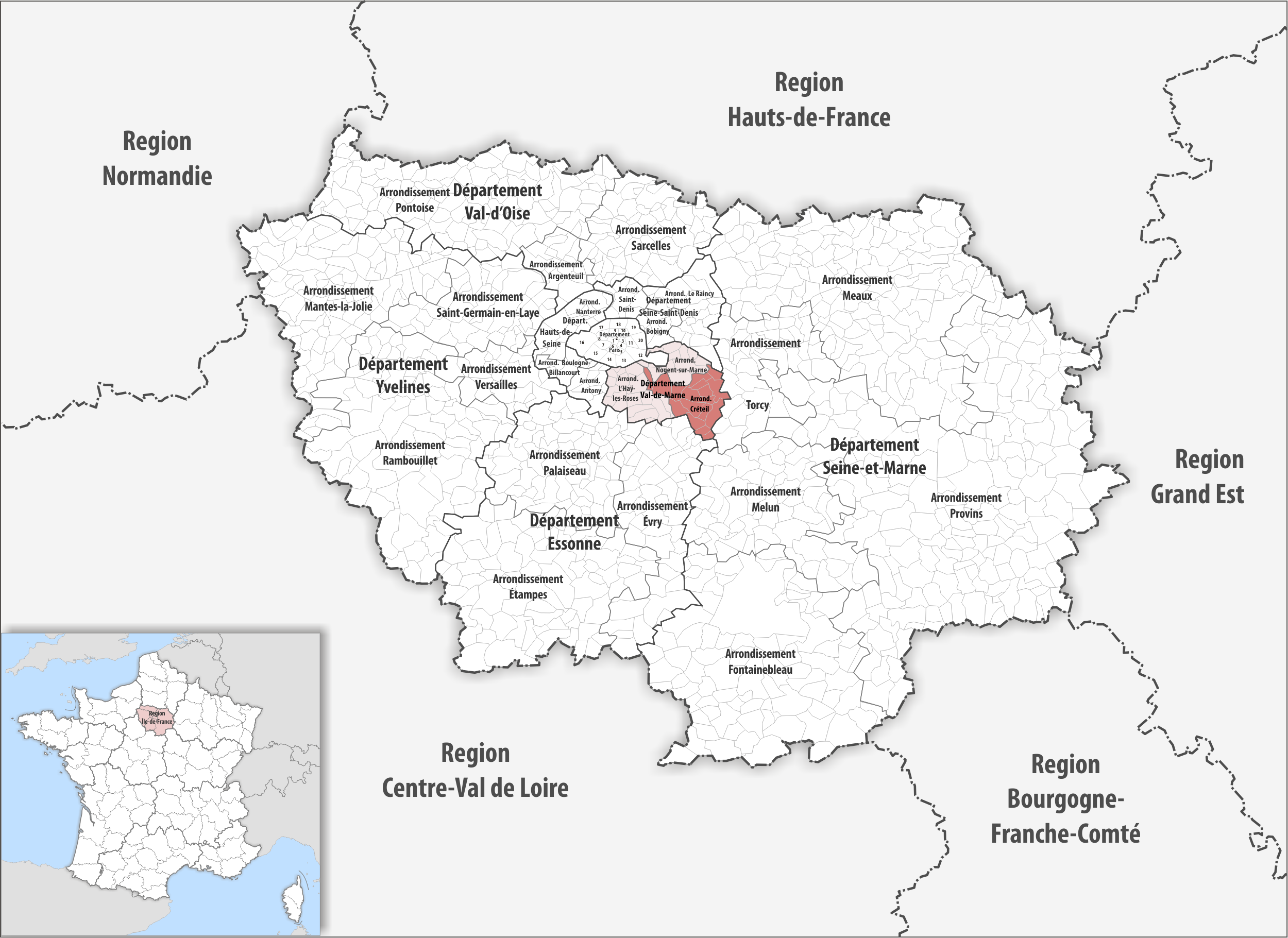
- Location within the region Île-de-France
- Country: France
- Region: Île-de-France
- Department: Val-de-Marne
- No. of communes: 16
- Area: 99.8 km^{2} (38.5 sq mi)
- Population (2023): 325,348
  - Density: 3,260/km^{2} (8,440/sq mi)
- INSEE code: 941

The arrondissement of Créteil is an arrondissement of France in the Val-de-Marne department in the Île-de-France region. It has 16 communes. Its population is 323,676 (2021), and its area is 99.8 km^{2} (38.5 sq mi).

== Composition ==
The communes of the arrondissement of Créteil, and their INSEE codes, are:

1. Alfortville (94002)
2. Boissy-Saint-Léger (94004)
3. Bonneuil-sur-Marne (94011)
4. Chennevières-sur-Marne (94019)
5. Créteil (94028)
6. Limeil-Brévannes (94044)
7. Mandres-les-Roses (94047)
8. Marolles-en-Brie (94048)
9. Noiseau (94053)
10. Ormesson-sur-Marne (94055)
11. Périgny (94056)
12. Le Plessis-Trévise (94059)
13. La Queue-en-Brie (94060)
14. Santeny (94070)
15. Sucy-en-Brie (94071)
16. Villecresnes (94075)

== History ==
The arrondissement of Créteil was created in 1964 as part of the department Seine. In 1968 it became part of the new department Val-de-Marne. On 25 February 2017, it lost 8 communes to the arrondissement of L'Haÿ-les-Roses, and it lost 2 communes to and gained 3 communes from the arrondissement of Nogent-sur-Marne.

As a result of the reorganisation of the cantons of France which came into effect in 2015, the borders of the cantons are no longer related to the borders of the arrondissements. The cantons of the arrondissement of Créteil were, as of January 2015:

1. Alfortville-Nord
2. Alfortville-Sud
3. Boissy-Saint-Léger
4. Bonneuil-sur-Marne
5. Charenton-le-Pont
6. Choisy-le-Roi
7. Créteil-Nord
8. Créteil-Ouest
9. Créteil-Sud
10. Ivry-sur-Seine-Est
11. Ivry-sur-Seine-Ouest
12. Maisons-Alfort-Nord
13. Maisons-Alfort-Sud
14. Orly
15. Saint-Maur-des-Fossés-Centre
16. Saint-Maur-des-Fossés-Ouest
17. Saint-Maur-La Varenne
18. Sucy-en-Brie
19. Valenton
20. Villecresnes
21. Villeneuve-le-Roi
22. Villeneuve-Saint-Georges
23. Vitry-sur-Seine-Est
24. Vitry-sur-Seine-Nord
25. Vitry-sur-Seine-Ouest
