= Arrondissement of L'Haÿ-les-Roses =

Coordinates: 48°46′31″N 2°20′10″E

L'Haÿ-les-Roses
- Arrondissement
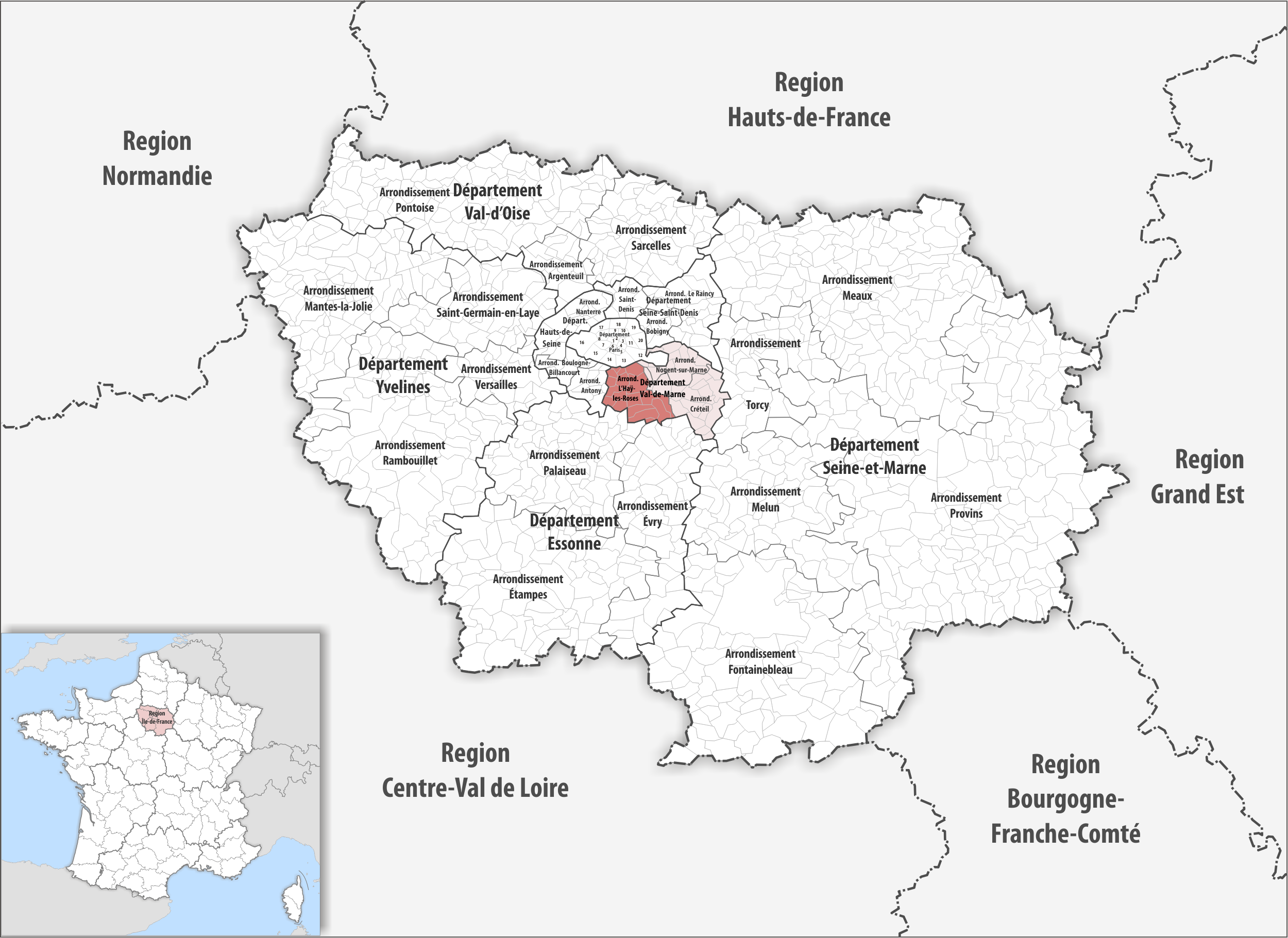
- Location within the region Île-de-France
- Country: France
- Region: Île-de-France
- Department: Val-de-Marne
- No. of communes: {{{nbcomm}}}
- Area: 88.9 km^{2} (34.3 sq mi)
- Population (2023): 583,876
  - Density: 6,570/km^{2} (17,000/sq mi)
- INSEE code: 943

The arrondissement of L'Haÿ-les-Roses (French: [laj le ʁɔz]) is an arrondissement of France in the Val-de-Marne department in the Île-de-France region. It has 18 communes. Its population is 578,438 (2021), and its area is 88.9 km^{2} (34.3 sq mi).

== Composition ==
The communes of the arrondissement of L'Haÿ-les-Roses, and their INSEE codes, are:

1. Ablon-sur-Seine (94001)
2. Arcueil (94003)
3. Cachan (94016)
4. Chevilly-Larue (94021)
5. Choisy-le-Roi (94022)
6. Fresnes (94034)
7. Gentilly (94037)
8. L'Haÿ-les-Roses (94038)
9. Ivry-sur-Seine (94041)
10. Le Kremlin-Bicêtre (94043)
11. Orly (94054)
12. Rungis (94065)
13. Thiais (94073)
14. Valenton (94074)
15. Villejuif (94076)
16. Villeneuve-le-Roi (94077)
17. Villeneuve-Saint-Georges (94078)
18. Vitry-sur-Seine (94081)

== History ==
The arrondissement of L'Haÿ-les-Roses was created in January 1973. On 25 February 2017, it gained 8 communes from the arrondissement of Créteil.

As a result of the reorganisation of the cantons of France which came into effect in 2015, the borders of the cantons are no longer related to the borders of the arrondissements. The cantons of the arrondissement of Créteil were, as of January 2015:

1. Arcueil
2. Cachan
3. Chevilly-Larue
4. Fresnes
5. L'Haÿ-les-Roses
6. Le Kremlin-Bicêtre
7. Thiais
8. Villejuif-Est
9. Villejuif-Ouest

== Sub-prefects ==
- Pierre-Henry Maccioni : on 9 March 1990
- Hugues Bousiges : 1996-1998
