= Périgny, Val-de-Marne =

Périgny
- Commune
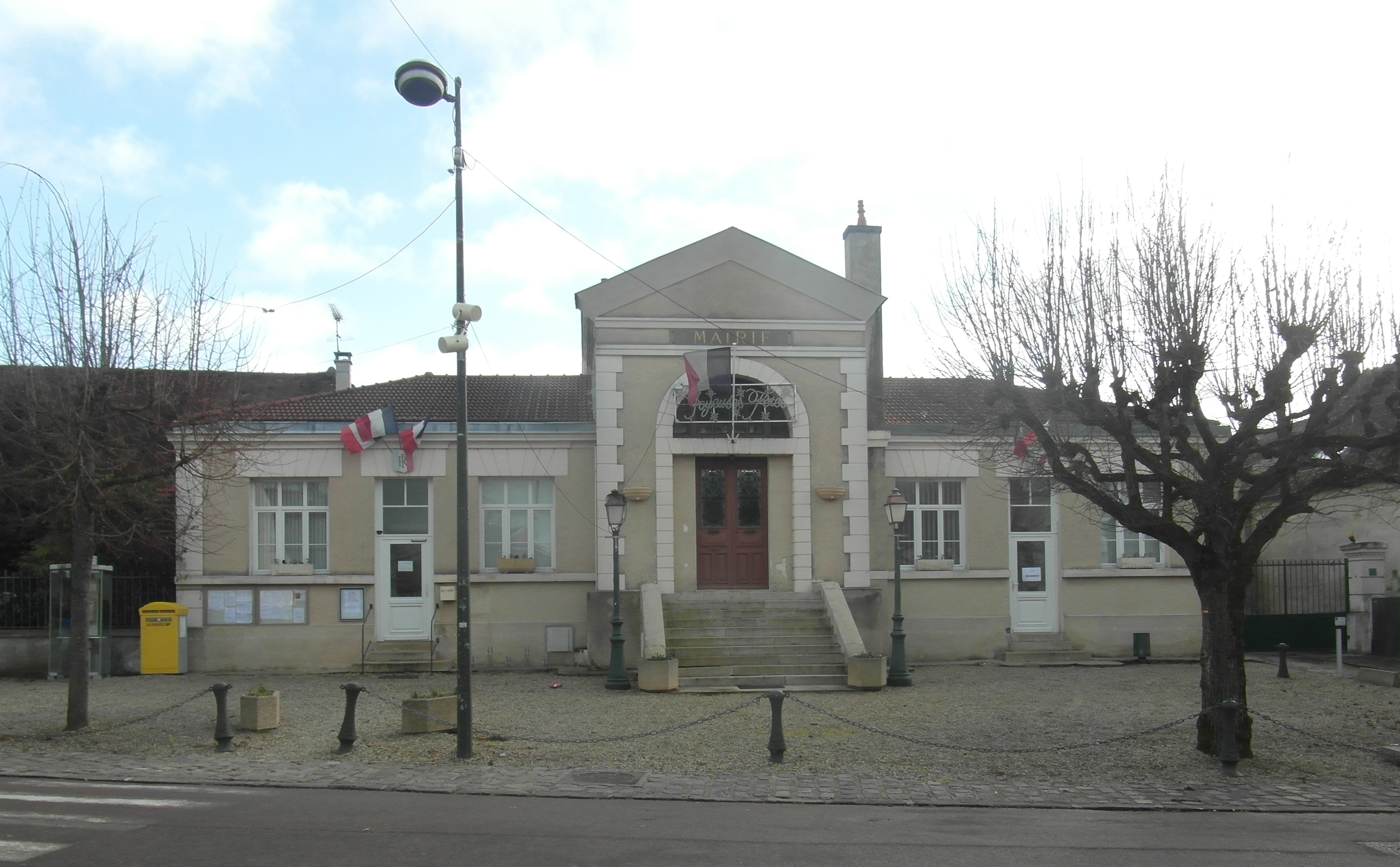
- The town hall of Périgny

- Location (in red) within Paris inner suburbs
- Location of Périgny
- Location within France Location within Île-de-France (region)
- Coordinates: 48°41′43″N 2°33′06″E
- Country: France
- Region: Île-de-France
- Department: Val-de-Marne
- Arrondissement: Créteil
- Canton: Plateau briard
- Intercommunality: Grand Paris

Government
  - Mayor (2026–32): Arnaud Vedie
- Area^{1}: 2.79 km^{2} (1.08 sq mi)
- Population (2023): 2,724
  - Density: 976/km^{2} (2,530/sq mi)
- Time zone: UTC+01:00 (CET)
  - Summer (DST): UTC+02:00 (CEST)
- INSEE/Postal code: 94056 /
- ^{1} French Land Register data, which excludes lakes, ponds, glaciers > 1 km^{2} (0.386 sq mi or 247 acres) and river estuaries.

Périgny (French pronunciation: [peʁiɲi]), also known as Périgny-sur-Yerres, is a commune in the southeastern suburbs of Paris, France. It is located 23.3 km (14.5 mi) from the center of Paris.

== Transport ==
Périgny is served by no station of the Paris Métro, RER, or suburban rail network. The closest station to Périgny is Boussy-Saint-Antoine station on Paris RER line D. This station is located in the neighboring commune of Boussy-Saint-Antoine, 2.1 km (1.3 mi) from the town center of Périgny.

== Population ==
Historical population
| Year | Pop. | ±% p.a. |
|---|---|---|
| 1968 | 437 | — |
| 1975 | 1,011 | +12.73% |
| 1982 | 1,673 | +7.46% |
| 1990 | 1,681 | +0.06% |
| 1999 | 2,020 | +2.06% |
| 2007 | 2,232 | +1.26% |
| 2012 | 2,485 | +2.17% |
| 2017 | 2,668 | +1.43% |
| 2023 | 2,724 | +0.35% |
Source: INSEE

== Education ==
Schools in the commune include Ecole maternelle Suzanne Heinrich (preschool/nursery) and Ecole élémentaire Georges Hure. Junior high school students are assigned to Collège Simone Veil in Mandres-les-Roses, built in 2007. Senior high school/sixth-form students may attend Lycée Guillaume Budé in Limeil-Brévannes and Lycée Christophe Colomb in Sucy-en-Brie.

== See also ==
- Communes of the Val-de-Marne department
