= Marie Meurdrac =

Chemist in the 17th century

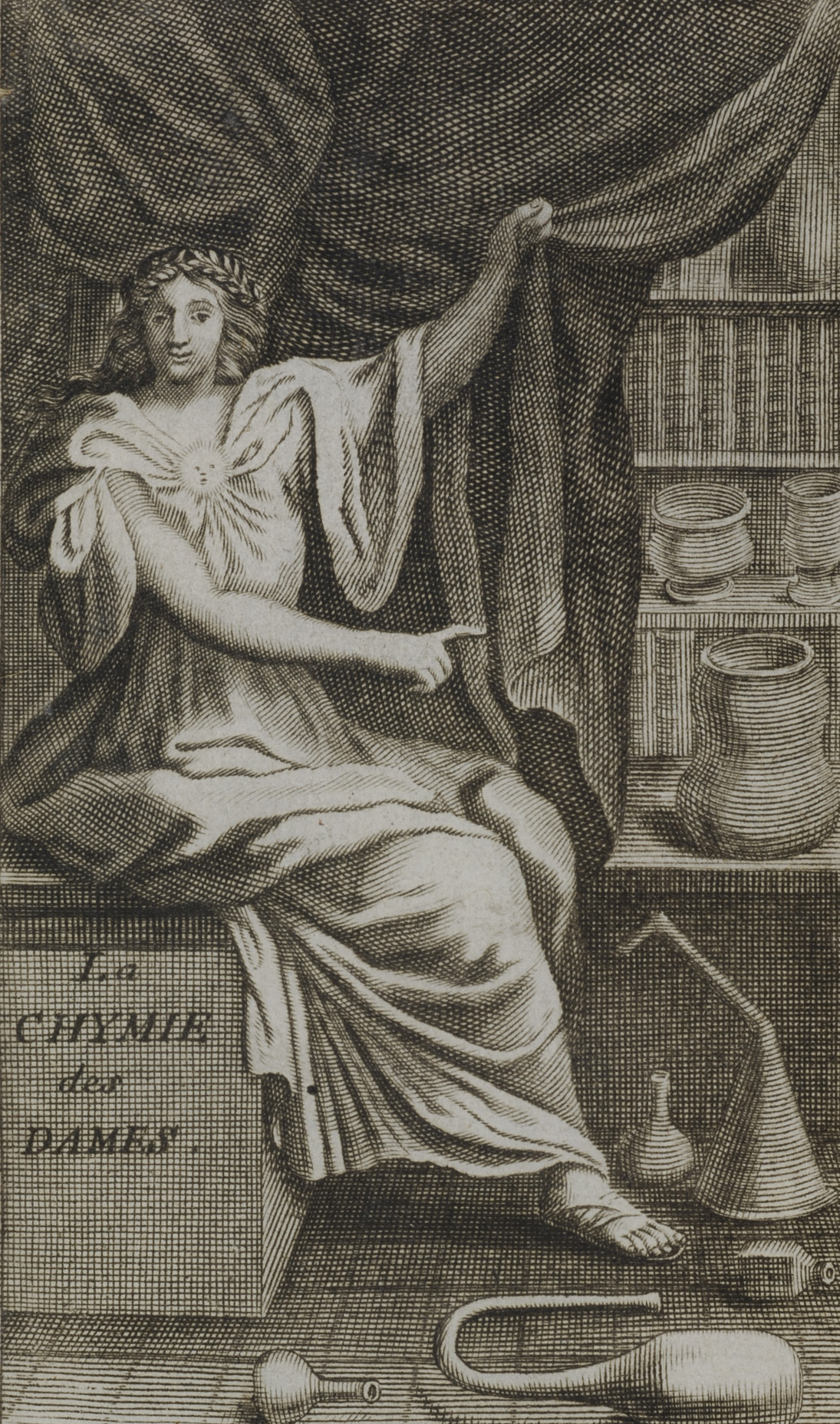
- Frontispiece of La Chymie ... des Dames, 1687 edition
- Born: c. 1610; Mandres-les-Roses, France
- Died: 1680 (aged around 70)
- Notable work: La Chymie Charitable et Facile, en Faveur des Dames
- Scientific career
- Fields: Chemistry; Alchemy

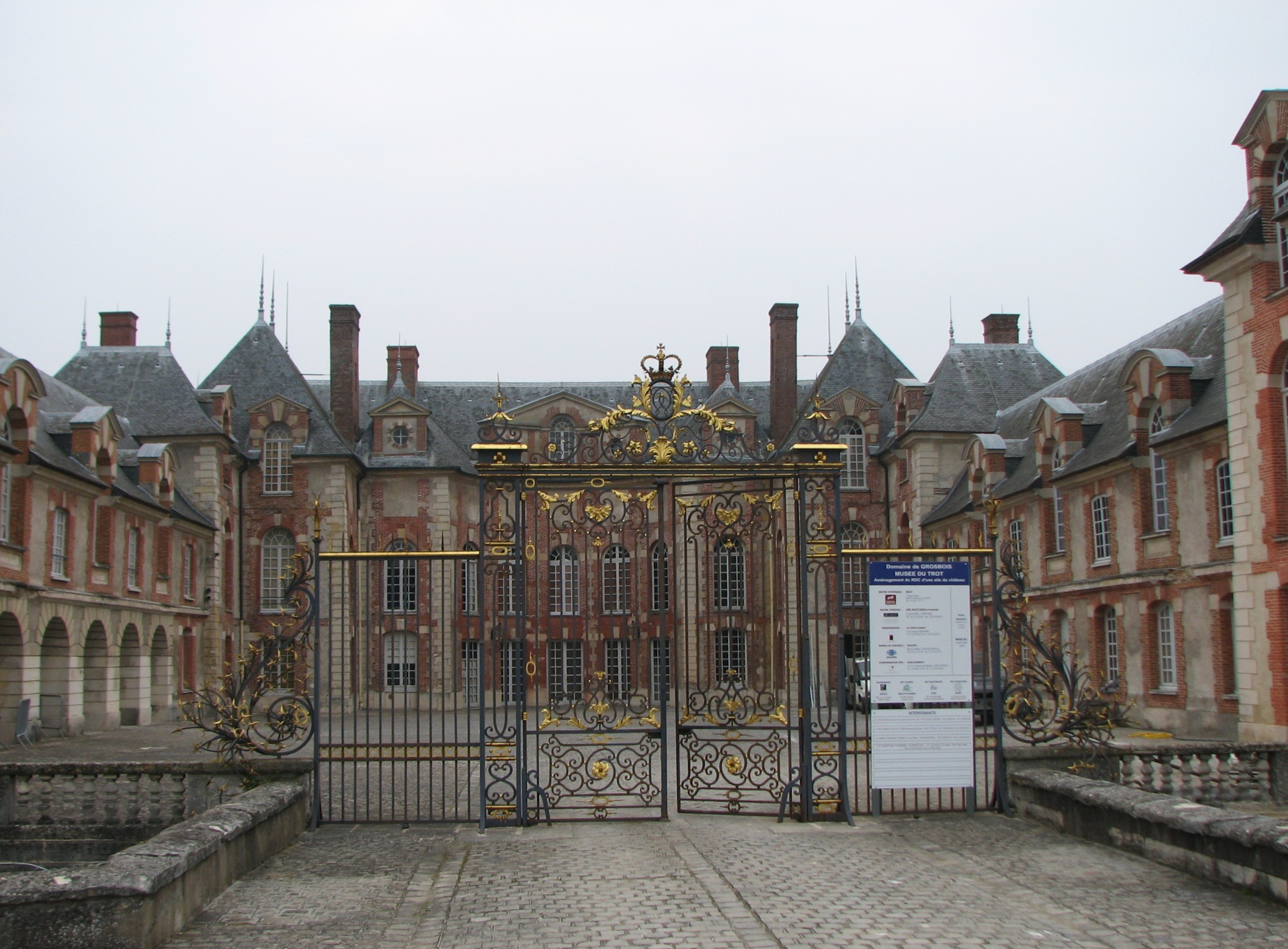
The Château de Grosbois, where Meurdrac lived for a period

Marie Meurdrac (c. 1610 – 1680) was a French chemist and alchemist known for writing La Chymie Charitable et Facile, en Faveur des Dames [Easy Chemistry for Women], a treatise on chemistry aimed at common women. It is through this book that her name has survived to the present day, and scholars have argued that this was the first work on chemistry or alchemy by a woman since that of Maria the Jewess in the late classical period. Historian Lucia Tosi described Meurdrac as the first woman to publish a book on early chemistry. Though she was reluctant to write, concerned about criticism from those who did not believe women should receive an education, she was a proto-feminist, and believed that "minds have no sex."

== Early life ==
Marie Meurdrac was born around 1610 in Mandres-les-Roses, about 20 km (12 mi) southeast of Paris, into a landowning family. Her father, Vincent Meurdrac, was a local notary who died in 1650, and her mother, Elisabeth Dovet, died in 1636. Marie was the elder of two sisters. Catherine, born about three years after her in 1613, later became known as Madame de La Guette and published her Memoirs in 1681.

Little is known about Meurdrac's childhood, but some traces of it survive in the records of Mandres. She was described as more serious than her younger sister, and parish records show that she served as godmother to several children. Other members of the Meurdrac family also frequently served as godparents in the village.

In 1625, when she was about 15, Meurdrac married Henri de Vibrac, a commander in the guard of Charles de Valois, Duke of Angoulême. She later lived at the Château de Grosbois, southeast of Paris, where her sister remembered visiting her.

Meurdrac became acquainted with the Countess de Guiche, wife of Armand de Gramont. She later dedicated her chemistry book, La Chymie charitable et facile, en faveur des dames, to the Countess.

== Career ==
Meurdrac was self-taught, and learned chemistry using works and experiments from other scientists and by reading theoretical works on alchemy and chemistry. In her studies, she covered items such as lab techniques, properties of medicines, and cosmetics. In her work, she also had a table of weights and 106 alchemical symbols that were used in medicine at the time. Meurdrac had access to a high temperature furnace that she used for her experiments, unusual for the time, as it required special permission from the king. This suggests that she must have had such royal assent, possibly gained through her connection with the Countess de Guiche.

== Teaching ==
In the mid-17th century, Meurdrac taught women in her own laboratory, where she also carried out chemical experiments. She offered private lessons to women who wanted practical help with the procedures described in her work. Her instruction covered chemistry and its applications to botany, pharmacology, medicine and cosmetics.

Meurdrac provided both written instructions and practical demonstrations. In La Chymie charitable et facile, en faveur des dames, she explained chemical principles and described how to prepare medicines and cosmetics. She invited women who did not feel confident carrying out the procedures themselves to visit her laboratory, where she offered to demonstrate the techniques or prepare the substances for them.

At the time, women, including those from wealthy families, were generally excluded from scientific education at universities. Few had opportunities to formally study subjects such as chemistry, medicine and natural philosophy. Meurdrac addressed women directly in La Chymie and offered them practical instruction outside the university system.

== La Chymie Charitable et Facile, en Faveur des Dames ==
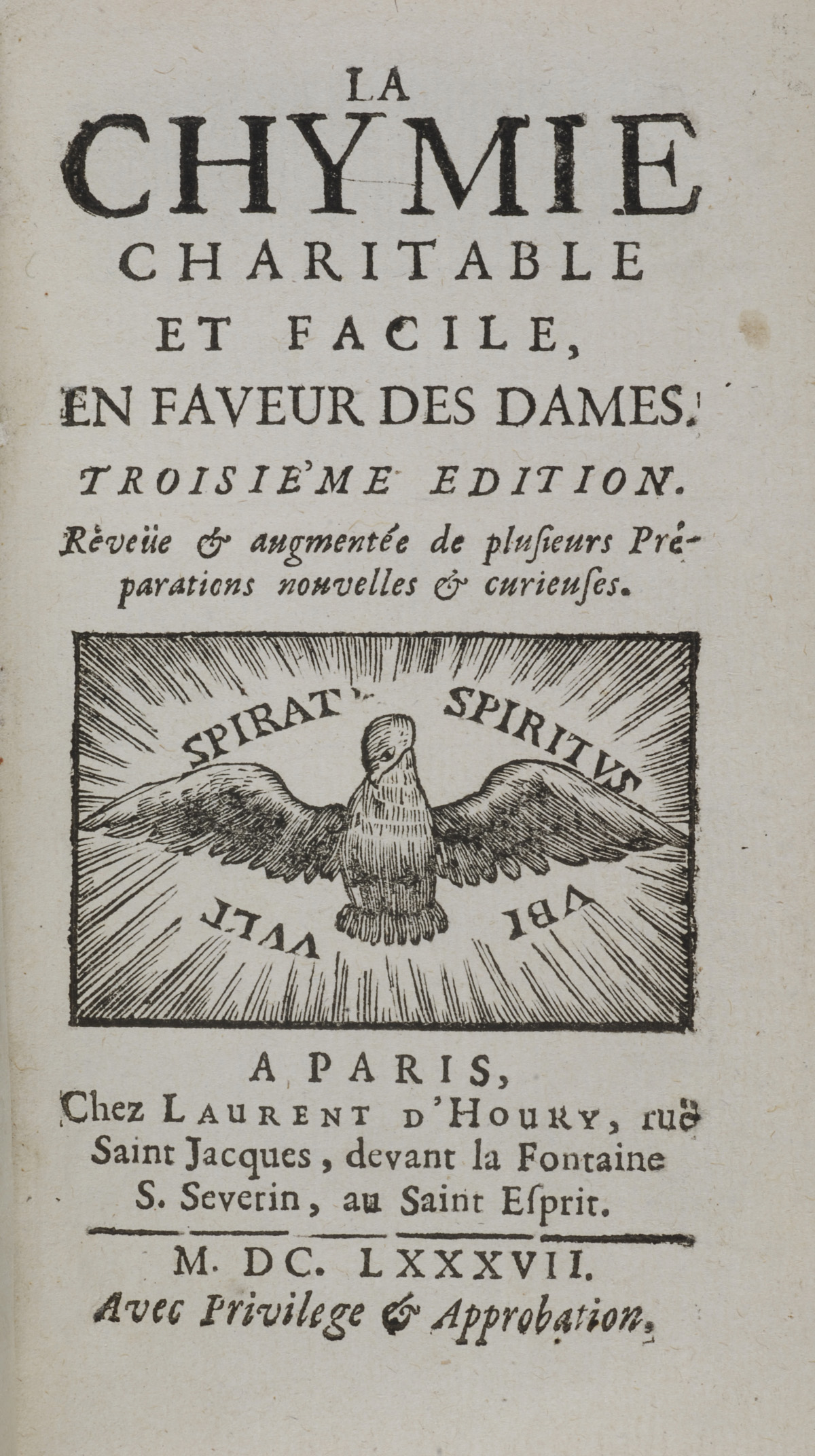
Title page of La Chymie ... des Dames, 1687 edition

In either 1656 or 1666 Meurdrac published her famous treatise La Chymie Charitable et Facile, en Faveur des Dames (roughly "Useful and Easy Chemistry, for the Benefit of Ladies"). Meurdrac's treatise was one of the first works on chemistry to be written by a woman.

The work, which was approved by the regent masters of the Faculty of Medicine of Paris, focused on providing affordable treatments for the poor.

The work was divided into six parts, part 1 focusing on principles and operations, vessels, lutes, furnaces, characteristics, and weights. Part 2 was concerned with medical herbs and medicines made from such plants. Part 3 dealt with animals and part 4 with metals. Part 5 focused on making compound medicines and part 6 was directed to a female audience and covered methods of preserving and increasing beauty.

Meurdrac wrote in her introduction about her methods that "I have been very careful not to go beyond my knowledge, and I can assure that everything I teach is true, and that all my remedies have been tested; for which I praise and glorify God" (translation Bishop and DeLoach, 1970).

On the second page of Meurdrac's treatise are the french words "les esprits n'ont point de sexe," translated to "minds have no sex." In this time, it was not ideal for women to be scientists. Meurdrac was aware of this, making her want to prove that she could publish a textbook for women and educate them as well.

== Reception and legacy ==
La Chymie charitable et facile, en faveur des dames continued to appear in new editions and translations long after Meurdrac wrote it in the 17th century. Modern scholars give different publication histories for the book. Science-education researcher Núria Solsona-Pairó identifies at least eight French editions, dated from 1656 to 1787, and at least four German editions, dated from 1673 to 1712. An Italian translation, La chimica caritatevole, e facile, in favor delle dame, was published in Venice in 1682.

More than three centuries later, scholars continue to classify Meurdrac's work in different ways. In 2001, historian of chemistry Lucia Tosi described Meurdrac as a Paracelsian chemist. In 2009, scholar Sandy Feinstein examined La Chymie in relation to the libri de segreti, books of practical medical, household and cosmetic recipes. In 2015, Solsona-Pairó examined Meurdrac's work in the history of alchemy. In 2019, scholar Sarah Gordon examined the connections between chemistry, medicine and cosmetics in Meurdrac's work.

Historians have also discussed Meurdrac's place among early women who wrote about chemistry. Tosi described her as the first woman to publish a book on early chemistry. Gordon described La Chymie as one of the earliest chemistry textbooks and the first such textbook written by a woman.

== Views on gender ==
In addition to the importance of her work in terms of female scientific endeavors, Meurdrac has been seen by some as a proto-feminist. In her introduction, Meurdrac outlines her "inner struggle" between the contemporary female ideal, which Meurdrac described as to be "silent, listen and learn, without displaying ... knowledge." However, she decides that "it would be a sin against Charity to hide the knowledge that God has given me, which may be of benefit to the world." Her eventual contribution of her works provided a foreshadowing of the paradigm shift that would later occur in the shift of alchemy to modern chemistry. Whether or not her work can be considered chemistry, Meurdrac directly contributed in a visible way that allowed for collaborative processes, and scrutiny, that would later define the field of modern chemistry and science as a whole.

=== From her dedication letter ===
"When I began this small treatise, it was for my sole satisfaction, so as not to lose memory of the knowledge that I had acquired by means of long toil, and by divers experiments repeated several times. I cannot conceal that seeing it achieved beyond what I had dared to expect, I was tempted to publish it; but if I had reason to bring it to light, I had even more reason to keep it hidden and not to expose it to general censure. ... I dwelt irresolute in this combat almost two years. I objected to myself that teaching was not the profession of a woman; that she ought to remain in silence, to listen and to learn, without bearing witness that she knows: that it is above her to give a work to the public, and that such a reputation is not by any means advantageous. ... I prided myself that I am not the first woman to have placed something under the press, that mind has no sex, and if the minds of women were cultivated like those of men, and if we employed as much time and money in their instruction they could become their equal."

== Influence ==
La Chymie interested Molière, and he based his comedy Les Femmes Savantes on it. The evidence given in Les Femmes Savantes backs up that Meurdrac most likely was the first woman in chemistry. This satirical play highlighted the women who devoted most of their time to experiments and academics, but it also critiques and ridicules a variety of groups, one being les femmes precieuses, which is a stereotypical group of educated women of France. However, while the play mentions subjects such as physics, mathematics, and astronomy, it does not mention chemistry. One of the reasons this satire does not include chemistry could be that Les Femmes Savantes was written in 1672, six years after the first edition of Meurdrac's La Chymie charitable and then two years before the second. This satire pushed the idea that women were not supposed to be educated, pointing out that if they were, these women were supposedly annoying and pedantic.

In 2026, the names of 72 women of science were proposed to be added to the Eiffel Tower. Meurdrac may have been a contender, but one criterion was that they should have lived after 1789, the date of the French Revolution, echoing the rule for the names of the 72 men of science added when the Eiffel Tower was built in 1889.

== See also ==
- Timeline of women in science
