= Le Plessis-Trévise =

- Commune
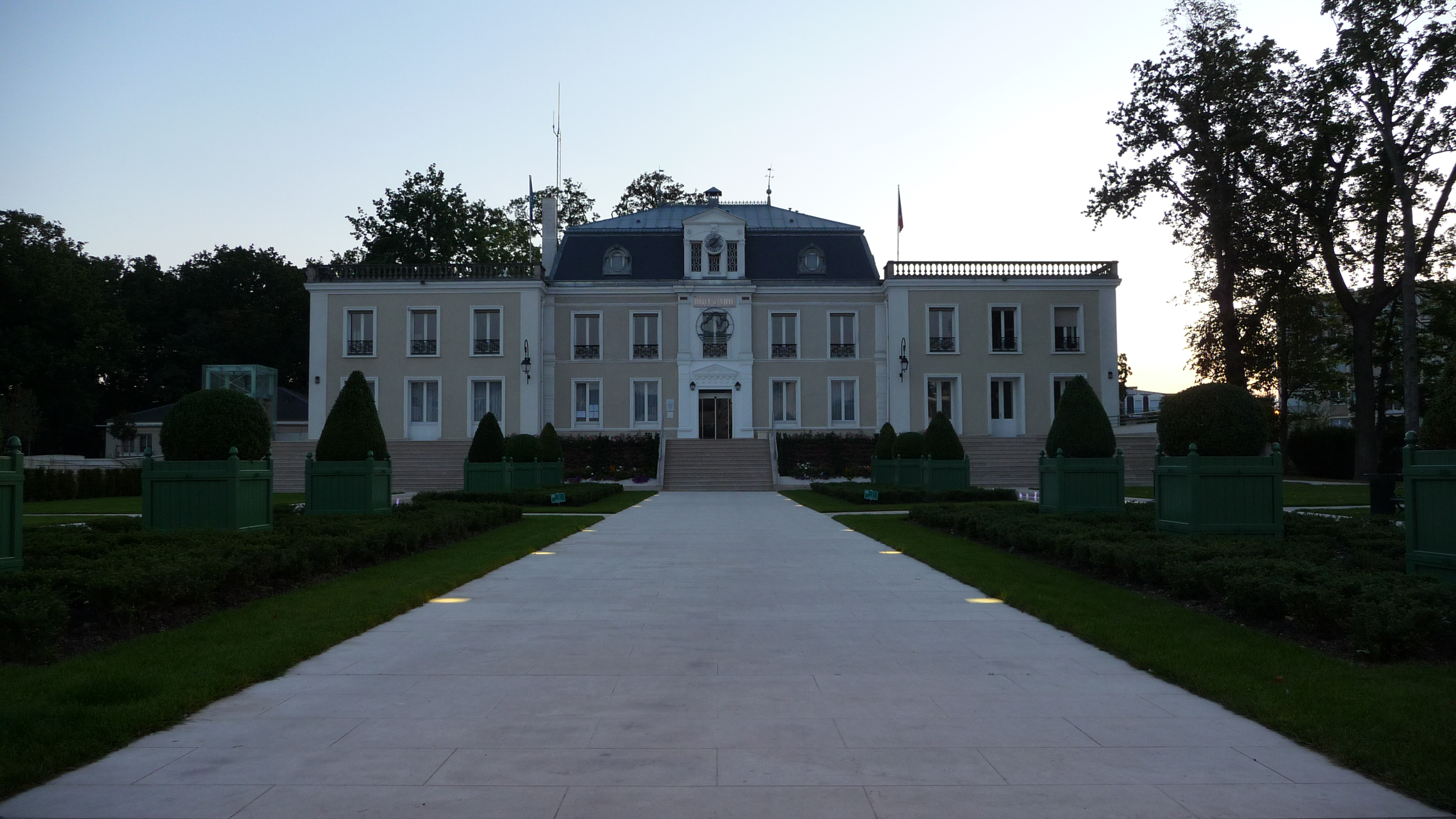
- The Hôtel de Ville, after its renovation in 2008

- Coat of arms

- Location (in red) within Paris inner suburbs
- Location of Le Plessis-Trévise
- Location within France Location within Île-de-France (region)
- Coordinates: 48°48′40″N 2°34′18″E
- Country: France
- Region: Île-de-France
- Department: Val-de-Marne
- Arrondissement: Créteil
- Canton: Villiers-sur-Marne
- Intercommunality: Grand Paris

Government
  - Mayor (2026–32): Alexis Marechal
- Area^{1}: 4.32 km^{2} (1.67 sq mi)
- Population (2023): 21,112
  - Density: 4,890/km^{2} (12,700/sq mi)
- Time zone: UTC+01:00 (CET)
  - Summer (DST): UTC+02:00 (CEST)
- INSEE/Postal code: 94059 /94420
- ^{1} French Land Register data, which excludes lakes, ponds, glaciers > 1 km^{2} (0.386 sq mi or 247 acres) and river estuaries.

Le Plessis-Trévise (French pronunciation: [lə plɛsi tʁeviz]) is a commune in the eastern suburbs of Paris, France. It is located 17.4 km (10.8 mi) from the center of Paris.

== History ==
The commune of Le Plessis-Trévise was created on 7 July 1899 by detaching a part of the territory of La Queue-en-Brie and merging it with a part of the territory of Chennevières-sur-Marne and a part of the territory of Villiers-sur-Marne. The Hôtel de Ville is a former private residence completed in 1866.

== Population ==
Historical population

Year	Pop.	±% p.a.
1901	921	—
1906	835	−1.94%
1911	868	+0.78%
1921	1,189	+3.20%
1926	1,469	+4.32%
1931	1,636	+2.18%
1936	1,391	−3.19%
1946	1,338	−0.39%
1954	2,426	+7.72%
1962	5,180	+9.95%

Year	Pop.	±% p.a.
1968	8,392	+8.37%
1975	12,991	+6.44%
1982	13,565	+0.62%
1990	14,583	+0.91%
1999	16,656	+1.49%
2007	18,246	+1.15%
2012	18,976	+0.79%
2017	20,130	+1.19%
2023	21,112	+0.80%

Source: EHESS and INSEE (1968-2023)

== Transport ==
Le Plessis-Trévise is served by no station of the Paris Métro, RER, or suburban rail network. The closest station to Le Plessis-Trévise is Villiers-sur-Marne–Le Plessis-Trévise station on Paris RER line E. This station is located in the neighboring commune of Villiers-sur-Marne, 2.8 km (1.7 mi) from the town center of Le Plessis-Trévise.

== Education ==
Schools in the commune include:

- Five preschools/nurseries (maternelles): Charcot, La Maréchale, Olympe de Gouges, Saint-Exupéry, Val Roger
- Five elementary schools: Marie-Louise/Marcel Salmon, Marbeau, Jean Moulin, Jean Monnet, Val Roger
- One junior high school: Collège Albert Camus

The senior high school/sixth-form college Lycée Champlain in Chennevières-sur-Marne serves Le Plessis-Trévise.

== Twin towns ==
Le Plessis-Trévise is twinned with:

- Burladingen, Germany since 1988
- Ourém, Portugal since 1992
- Wągrowiec, Poland since 2006
- Sparta, Greece since 2018

== See also ==
- Communes of the Val-de-Marne department
