= Valenton =

- Commune
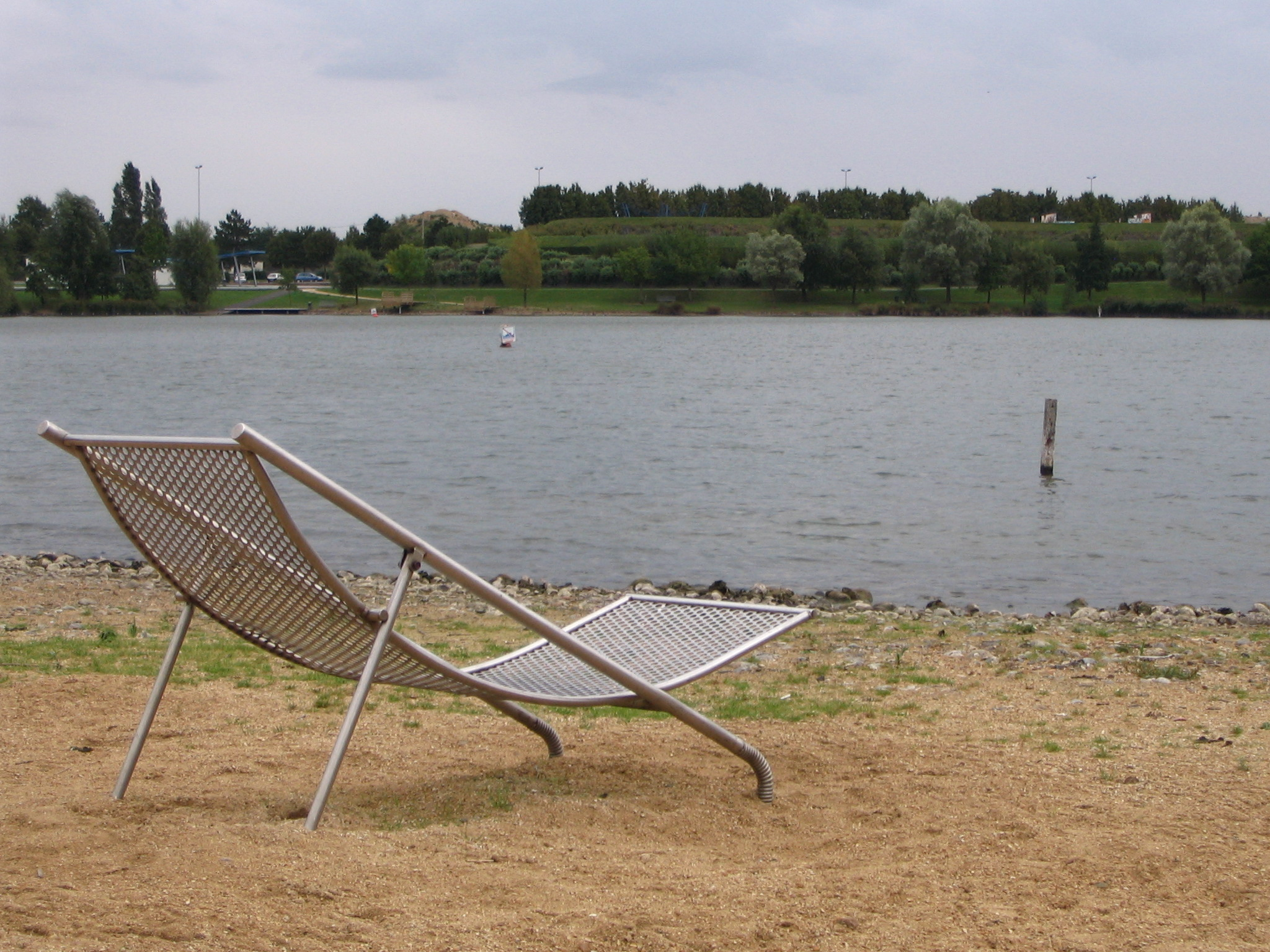
- Plage Bleue park

- Coat of arms

- Location (in red) within Paris inner suburbs
- Location of Valenton
- Location within France Location within Île-de-France (region)
- Coordinates: 48°44′42″N 2°28′02″E
- Country: France
- Region: Île-de-France
- Department: Val-de-Marne
- Arrondissement: L'Haÿ-les-Roses
- Canton: Villeneuve-Saint-Georges
- Intercommunality: Grand Paris

Government
  - Mayor (2026–32): Métin Yavuz
- Area^{1}: 5.31 km^{2} (2.05 sq mi)
- Highest elevation: 87 m (285 ft)
- Lowest elevation: 32 m (105 ft)
- Population (2023): 14,406
  - Density: 2,710/km^{2} (7,030/sq mi)
- Time zone: UTC+01:00 (CET)
  - Summer (DST): UTC+02:00 (CEST)
- INSEE/Postal code: 94074 /94460
- ^{1} French Land Register data, which excludes lakes, ponds, glaciers > 1 km^{2} (0.386 sq mi or 247 acres) and river estuaries.

Valenton (French pronunciation: [valɑ̃tɔ̃]) is a commune in the southeastern suburbs of Paris, France. It is located 15.1 km (9.4 mi) from the center of Paris. It extends over 531 hectares (1,310 acres) of which 84 hectares (210 acres) are green spaces. The most important public green space is the Plage Bleue Park where different events are organized every year. Among them, we have the Festival de l’Oh focused on environmental issues dealing with aquatic resources. Valenton is surrounded by the towns of Choisy-le-Roi, Créteil, Crosne, Limeil-Brévannes, Villeneuve-Saint-Georges and Yerres. The town can be reached through the motorway A86 and the main road RN6. It is connected to the suburban rail network with the RER line D (Villeneuve Triage and Villeneuve-Saint-Georges, the two closest stations) or RER line A at Boissy-Saint-Léger.

== History ==
Valenton was born in the 6th century. It was a dependency of the Abbey of Saint-Germain-des-Prés. The first inhabitants were mainly farmers specialized in viticulture. In 1726, it was still a village and had 250 inhabitants. Two centuries later, the population grew to about 1,000 inhabitants. The main activities became livestock farming and market gardening. The town extended in 1936 with the construction of two new residential areas (Les Vignes and Val Pompadour). At this time, the population was only 2,448. The town which was a strategic point during the Second World War was heavily bombarded by the Anglo-American aviation, which caused many casualties among the civil population. The aim for this heavy pounding induced by this air raid was to destroy the strategic marshalling yard of Villeneuve-Saint-Georges close to the Val Pompadour residential area. After the war, the town grew considerably. By 1962, the population reached 7,713 and in 1968 it was 10,539 inhabitants.

== Population ==
Historical population
Year	Pop.	±% p.a.
1968	10,539	—
1975	11,152	+0.81%
1982	10,621	−0.69%
1990	11,110	+0.56%
1999	11,426	+0.31%
2007	12,294	+0.92%
2012	12,231	−0.10%
2017	14,796	+3.88%
2023	14,406	−0.44%
Source: INSEE

== Administration ==
The current mayor of Valenton is Métin Yavuz, elected in 2020 and re-elected in 2026. The previous mayor was Françoise Baud, who had been in office from 2008 until 2020. Valenton was one of the French Communist Party's strongholds. It was ruled by the French Communist Party since 1920, two years before the creation of the USSR in 1922. The only exception was the period ranging from 1941 to 1944 when France was under the rule of the Government of Vichy. It was also one of France's first communes to have a female mayor (Fernande Flagon, elected in 1947).

== Activities ==
Valenton hosts a water purification station. This town is strongly dedicated to the cause of the environmental improvement in urban areas. Hence the numerous green spaces in the heart of the town. More than 190 companies are located in its six business areas.

The town's main cultural event: the Carnavalenton This successful cultural event is held every year in late June and it is the town's festival. It is the occasion for open-air concerts, exhibitions, many activities in which different charities take part. It is organized in the municipal central park (Parc de la Libération) and it lasts a whole day.

== Green spaces ==
La Plage Bleue is the most important park of Valenton. It was initially an agricultural area for market gardening at the beginning of the 20th century thanks to its fertile soils. Further, the industrial exploitation of sands and gravel in the site gave birth to several ponds. In the 1960s, the inhabitants used to go and swim in the area which was called "plage bleue" (blue beach). In 1979, the site was closed for insalubrity issues. By 1987, the Conseil Général and the Commune of Valenton decided to create a 40-hectare park, which was a success. The project won urban planning prizes in 1993 and 1994 rewarding its focus on environmental issues.

== Education ==
Schools in the commune include:

- 5 preschools (maternelles): Danielle-Casanova, Paul-Éluard, Paul-Langevin, Jean Lurçat, Henri-Wallon
- 4 elementary schools: Marcel-Cachin, Paul-Eluard, Paul-Langevin, Henri-Wallon
- 1 combined preschool and elementary school: Groupe scolaire Jean-Jaurès
- 1 junior high school: Collège Fernande-Flagon

Nearby senior high schools:

- Lycée François-Arago in Villeneuve-Saint-Georges
- Lycée Guillaume-Budé in Limeil-Brévannes
- Lycée Christophe-Colomb in Sucy-en-Brie
- Lycée hôtelier Montaleau in Sucy-en-Brie

== See also ==
- Communes of the Val-de-Marne department
