= Vincennes =

- Commune
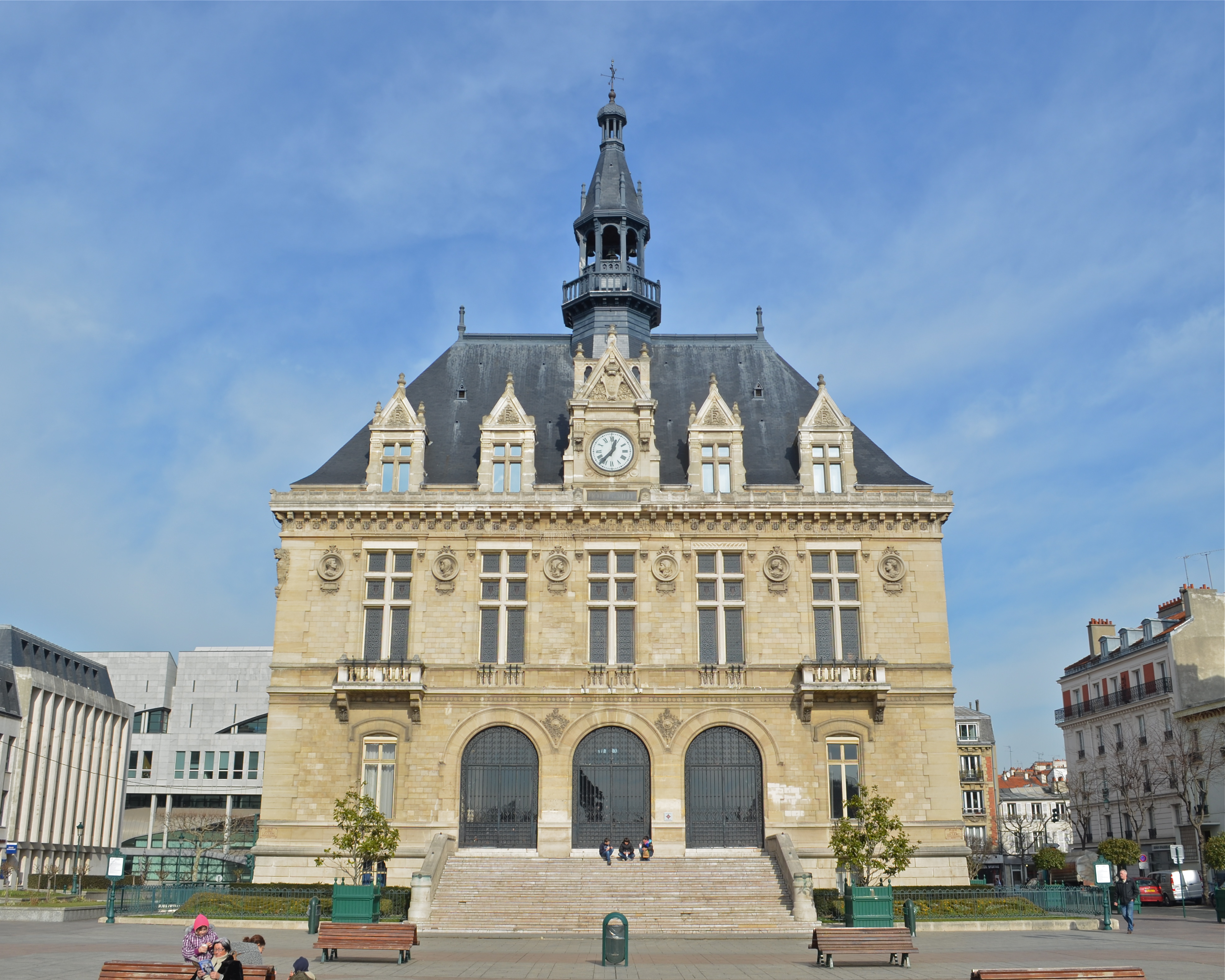
- The south front of the Hôtel de Ville

- Flag Coat of arms

- Location (in red) within Paris inner suburbs
- Location of Vincennes
- Location within France Location within Île-de-France (region)
- Coordinates: 48°50′52″N 2°26′21″E
- Country: France
- Region: Île-de-France
- Department: Val-de-Marne
- Arrondissement: Nogent-sur-Marne
- Canton: Vincennes and Fontenay-sous-Bois
- Intercommunality: Grand Paris

Government
  - Mayor (2026–32): Charlotte Libert-Albanel (UDI)
- Area^{1}: 1.91 km^{2} (0.74 sq mi)
- Population (2023): 48,193
  - Density: 25,200/km^{2} (65,400/sq mi)
- Time zone: UTC+01:00 (CET)
  - Summer (DST): UTC+02:00 (CEST)
- INSEE/Postal code: 94080 /94300
- ^{1} French Land Register data, which excludes lakes, ponds, glaciers > 1 km^{2} (0.386 sq mi or 247 acres) and river estuaries.

Vincennes (/vɪnˈsɛnz, væ̃ˈsɛn/; French: [vɛ̃sɛn]) is a commune in the Val-de-Marne department in the eastern suburbs of Paris, France. It is located 6.7 km (4.2 mi) from the centre of Paris. Vincennes is famous for its castle: the Château de Vincennes. It is next to but does not include the Bois de Vincennes, from which it took its name, which is attached to the city of Paris.

== History ==
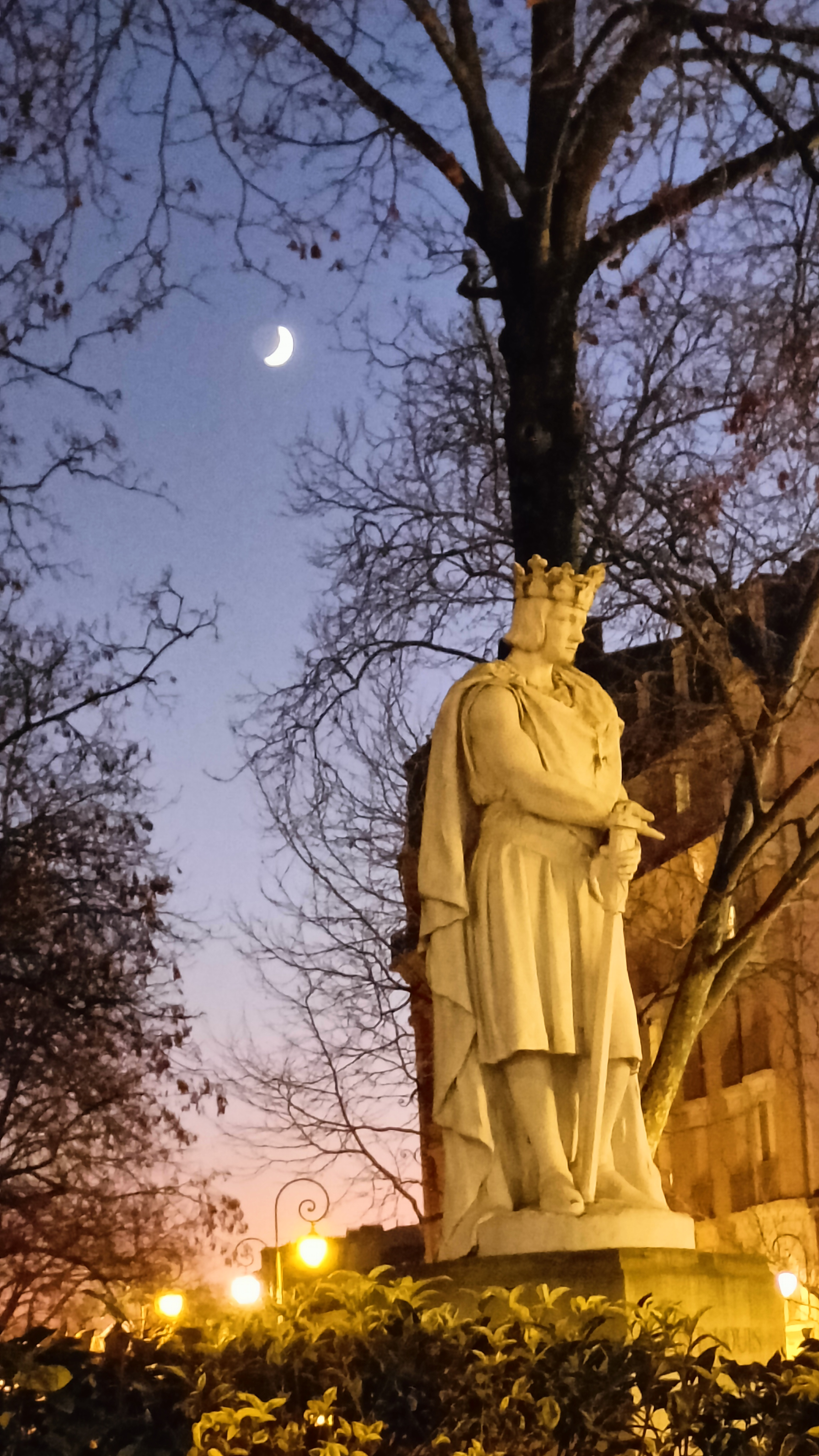
Statue of king Saint Louis at Château de Vincennes

The Marquis de Sade was imprisoned in Vincennes fortress in 1777, where he remained until February 1784 although he escaped for a little over a month in 1778. Thereafter Vincennes fortress was closed and de Sade transferred to the Bastille.

In 1821, the noted French poet, Alfred de Vigny, wrote his poem, "La Prison," which details the last days of the Man in the Iron Mask at Vincennes.

The ministers of Charles X were imprisoned at the fortress of Vincennes after the July Revolution.

A test was conducted in 1849 on Claude-Étienne Minié's invention the Minié ball which would prove successful and years later be adopted by the French army. The Hôtel de Ville was completed in 1891.

On the morning of 15 October 1917, famous femme fatale Mata Hari was executed for espionage by a French firing squad at Château de Vincennes.

In 1929, the commune of Vincennes lost about half of its territory when the city of Paris annexed the Bois de Vincennes, a large part of which belonged to the commune of Vincennes.

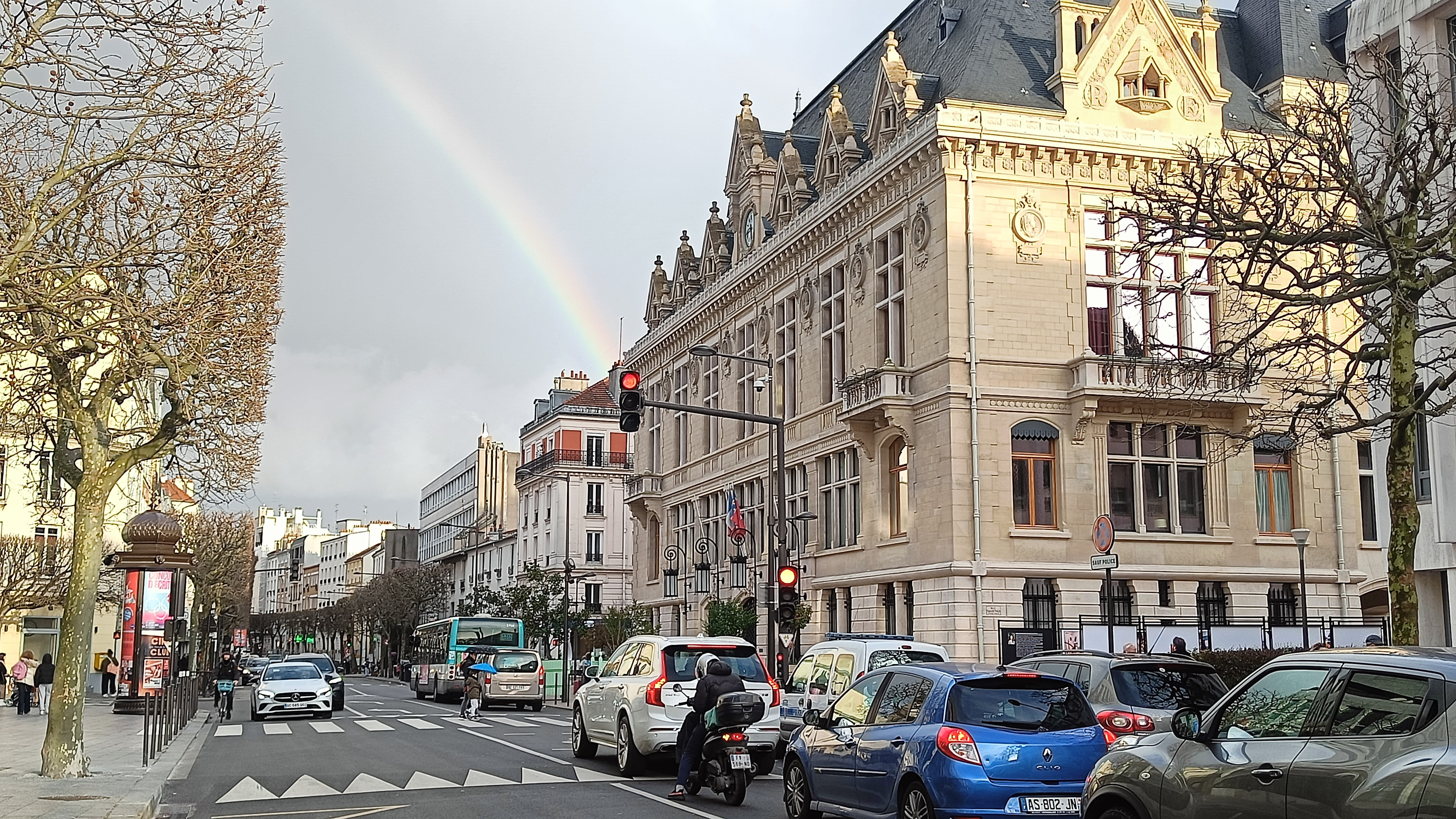
The north front of the Hôtel de Ville, Rue de Fontenay in Vincennes

Vincennes was also the site of some famous European colonial expositions in the 20th century in which fairs were held to showcase artifacts from former European colonies.

== Population ==
Historical population

Year	Pop.	±% p.a.
1793	2,014	—
1800	2,163	+1.02%
1806	1,853	−2.55%
1821	2,035	+0.63%
1831	2,854	+3.44%
1836	3,032	+1.22%
1841	3,522	+3.04%
1846	4,700	+5.94%
1851	4,765	+0.28%
1856	5,834	+4.13%
1861	13,414	+18.12%
1866	14,573	+1.67%
1872	17,064	+2.66%
1876	18,243	+1.68%
1881	20,530	+2.39%
1886	22,237	+1.61%
1891	24,626	+2.06%
1896	27,450	+2.20%
1901	31,405	+2.73%

Year	Pop.	±% p.a.
1906	34,185	+1.71%
1911	38,568	+2.44%
1921	41,527	+0.74%
1926	45,236	+1.73%
1931	46,859	+0.71%
1936	48,967	+0.88%
1946	49,226	+0.05%
1954	50,434	+0.30%
1962	50,436	+0.00%
1968	49,143	−0.43%
1975	44,261	−1.48%
1982	42,870	−0.46%
1990	42,267	−0.18%
1999	43,595	+0.34%
2007	47,372	+1.04%
2012	49,831	+1.02%
2017	49,891	+0.02%
2023	48,193	−0.58%

Source: EHESS and INSEE (1968-2023)

== Sights ==
The city is famous for its castle, the Château de Vincennes, and its park, the Bois de Vincennes hosting the only larger zoo in Paris, Paris Zoological Park (though these two are now within the limits of the City of Paris). It also features a large military fort, now housing various army services. This fort and an adjoining plain known as the "Polygon" has historically been an important proving ground for French armaments.

The city is also home to the Service Historique de la Défense (SHD), which holds the archival records of the French Armed Forces.

== Art ==
In 1933 Georges Saupique was commissioned to work on one of three "dessus-de-porte" to be placed above the doors of the new Vincennes' city hall "salle des fêtes". His composition involved allegorical figures representing commerce and industry supporting the Vincennes' coat of arms.

== Porcelain ==
In the old royal château, a porcelain manufactory was established in 1740, specializing in imitations of Meissen porcelain and naturalistic flowers, which were incorporated into bouquets under the direction of Parisian marchands-merciers. The Vincennes porcelain factory continued until 1756, when the production was transferred to new buildings at Sèvres, initiating the career of world-famous Sèvres porcelain.

== Transport ==
Vincennes is served by two stations on Paris Métro Line 1: Bérault and Château de Vincennes.

Vincennes is also served by Vincennes station on Paris RER line A.

== Twin towns – sister cities ==
Vincennes is twinned with:

- Blackrock, Ireland
- Castrop-Rauxel, Germany
- (England) Lambeth, United Kingdom
- Montigny-le-Tilleul, Belgium
- Tomar, Portugal
- Vincennes, United States

== Education ==
The commune has eight public preschools, six public elementary schools, and three private schools contracted by the state.

- Public elementary schools: Est-Passeleu, Est-Libération, Roland-Vernaudon, Sud, Ouest, Jean-Monnet
- Private elementary schools: Externat Saint-Joseph, Notre-Dame de la Providence, Ohel-Barouch

There are three public junior high schools, Collège Hector-Berlioz, Collège Saint-Exupéry, and Collège Françoise-Giroud; as well as a contracted private junior high school, Notre-Dame de la Providence.

Public senior high schools/sixth-form colleges:

- Lycée général et technologique Hector-Berlioz
- Lycée professionnel Jean-Moulin

Private senior high schools/sixth-form colleges:

- Notre-Dame de la Providence
- Lycée Grégor-Mendel
- Lycée Claude-Nicolas Ledoux

=== Vincennes University ===
In 1970 the "University of Paris VIII" was established in Vincennes as France's first major experiment in open admissions education, as a result of the academic reforms which followed the student risings of 1968. Intended to lessen the French university system's traditional emphasis on formal and elitist schooling, the school (generally known simply as Vincennes) admitted students without the usual entrance requirement of the baccalaureat degree and introduced courses such as the History of Cinema, Sexology, and Third World Economics. Enrollments peaked at 32,000 with more than 40% of students holding full-time jobs off the campus. However problems associated with political unrest and alleged widespread drug usage among the student body led to the resignation of the Vincennes University President and the relocation of the campus to Saint-Denis by the French Government in 1980.

== Notable people ==
- Thierry Mugler, fashion designer
- Marcel Deprez (1843–1918), electrical engineer, died in Vincennes
- Alphonse Halimi, boxer
- Marc du Pontavice and Alix de Maistre, producer and director, also owners of Xilam, lives in Vincennes since 1996
- Nicolas Pousset, ice hockey player
- Lætitia Sadier, musician
- Jules Toutain, archaeologist

== Gallery ==
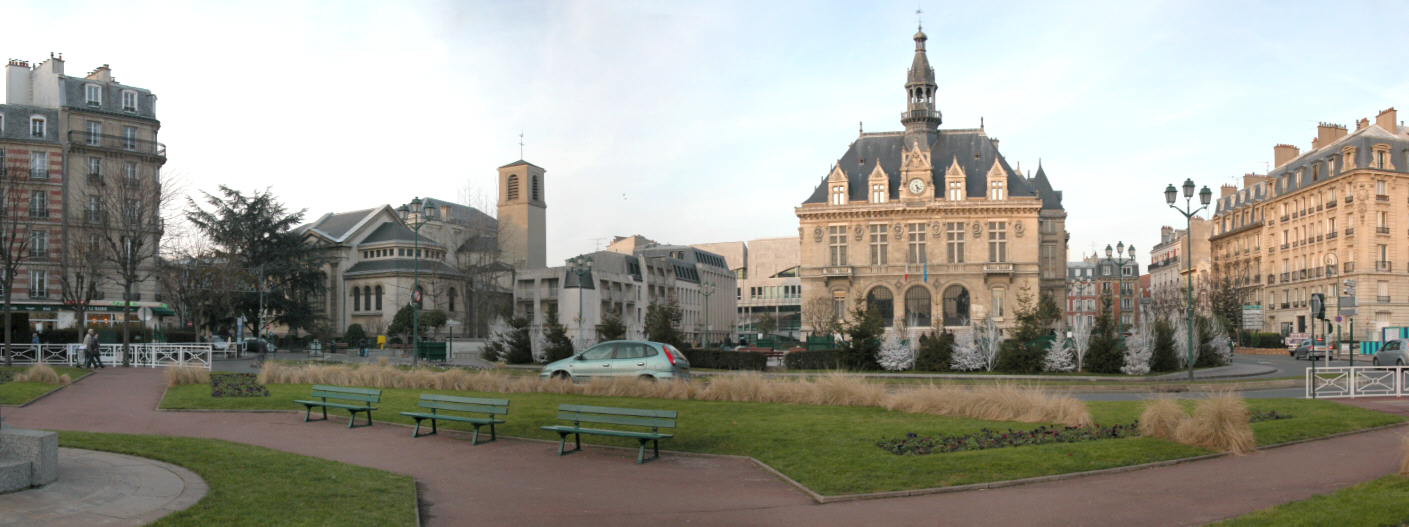
Panoramic view of the church and the Hôtel de Ville

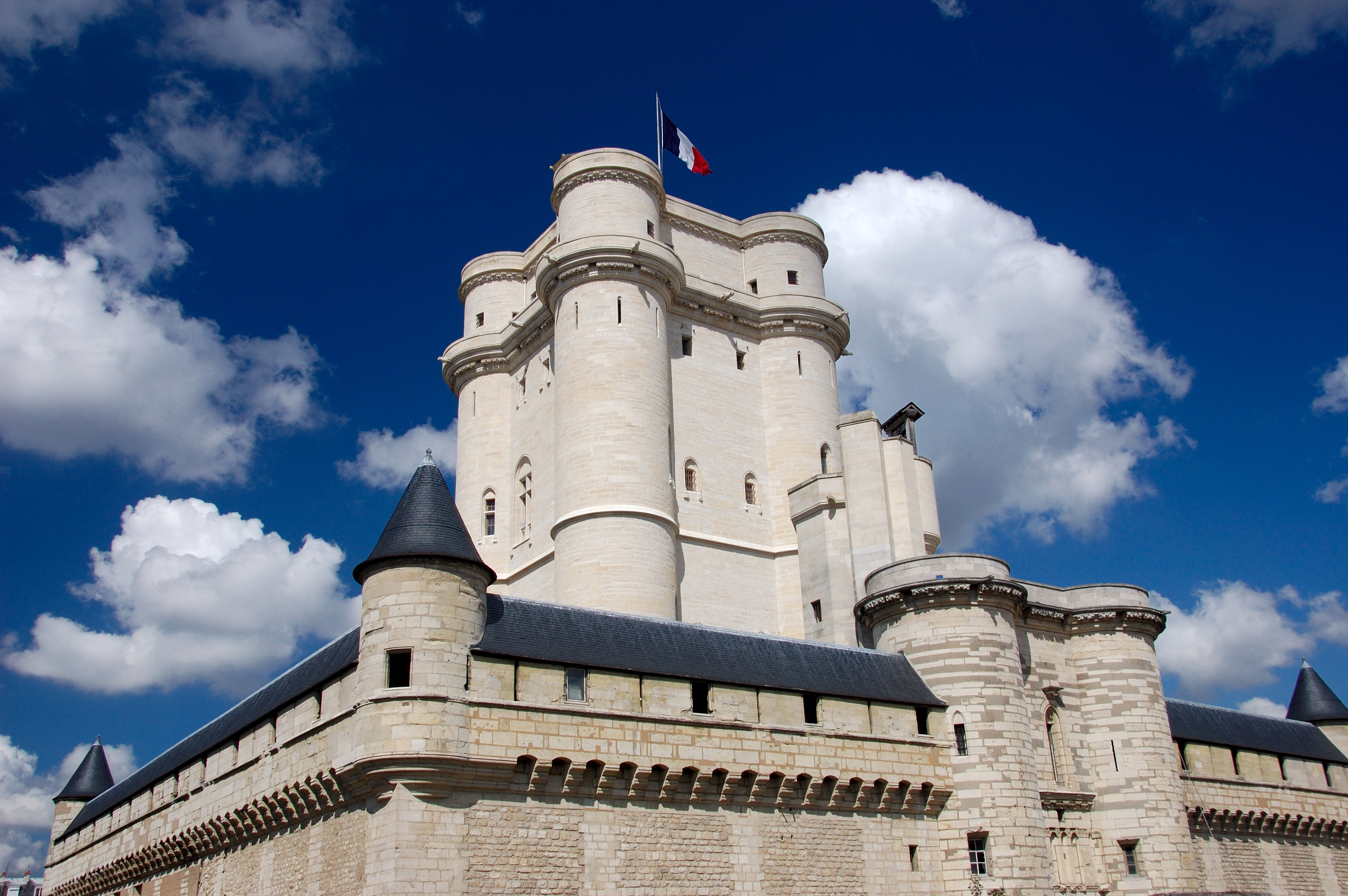
Main tower of the Vincennes medieval castle

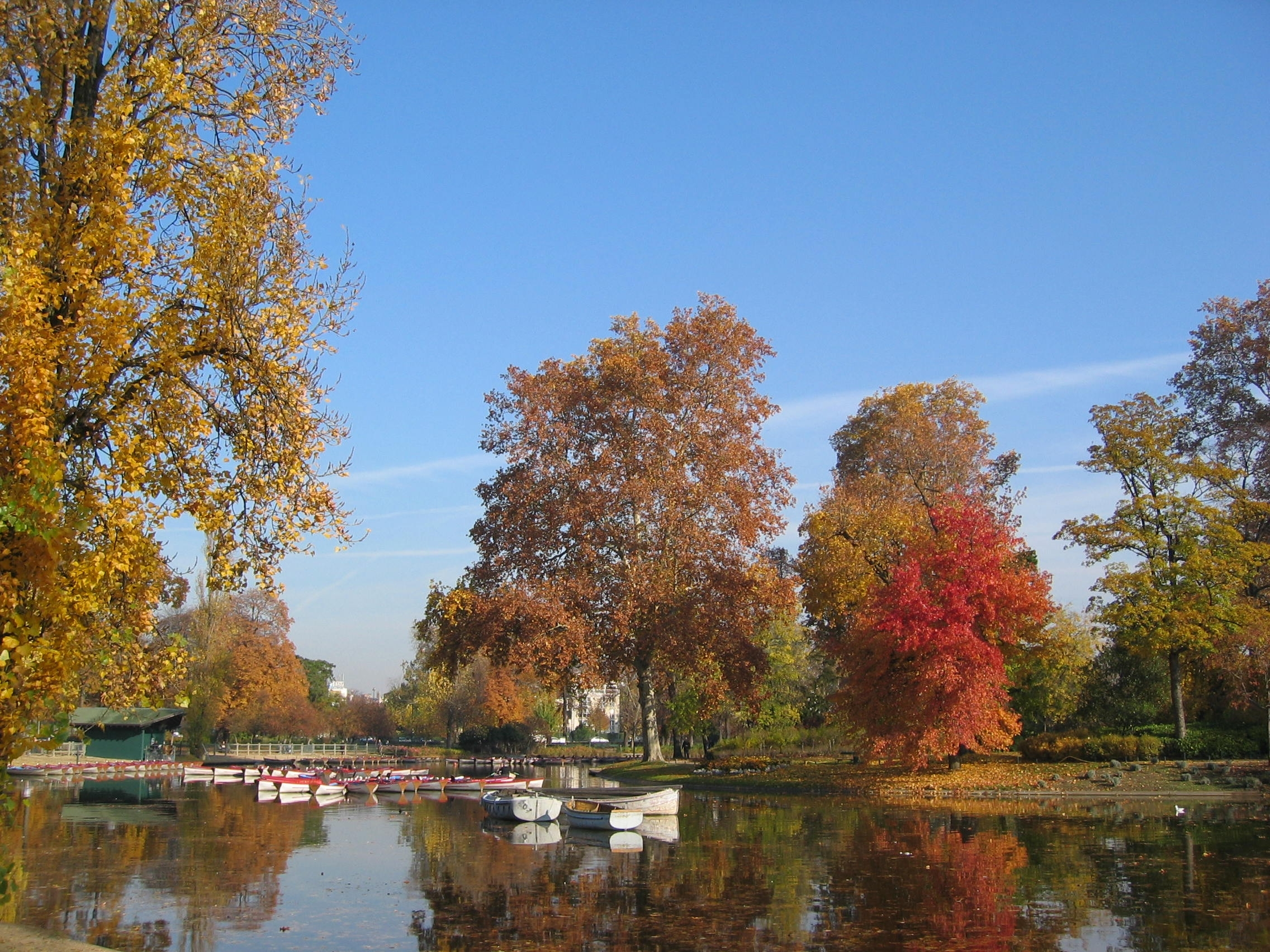
The Vincennes Park in autumn

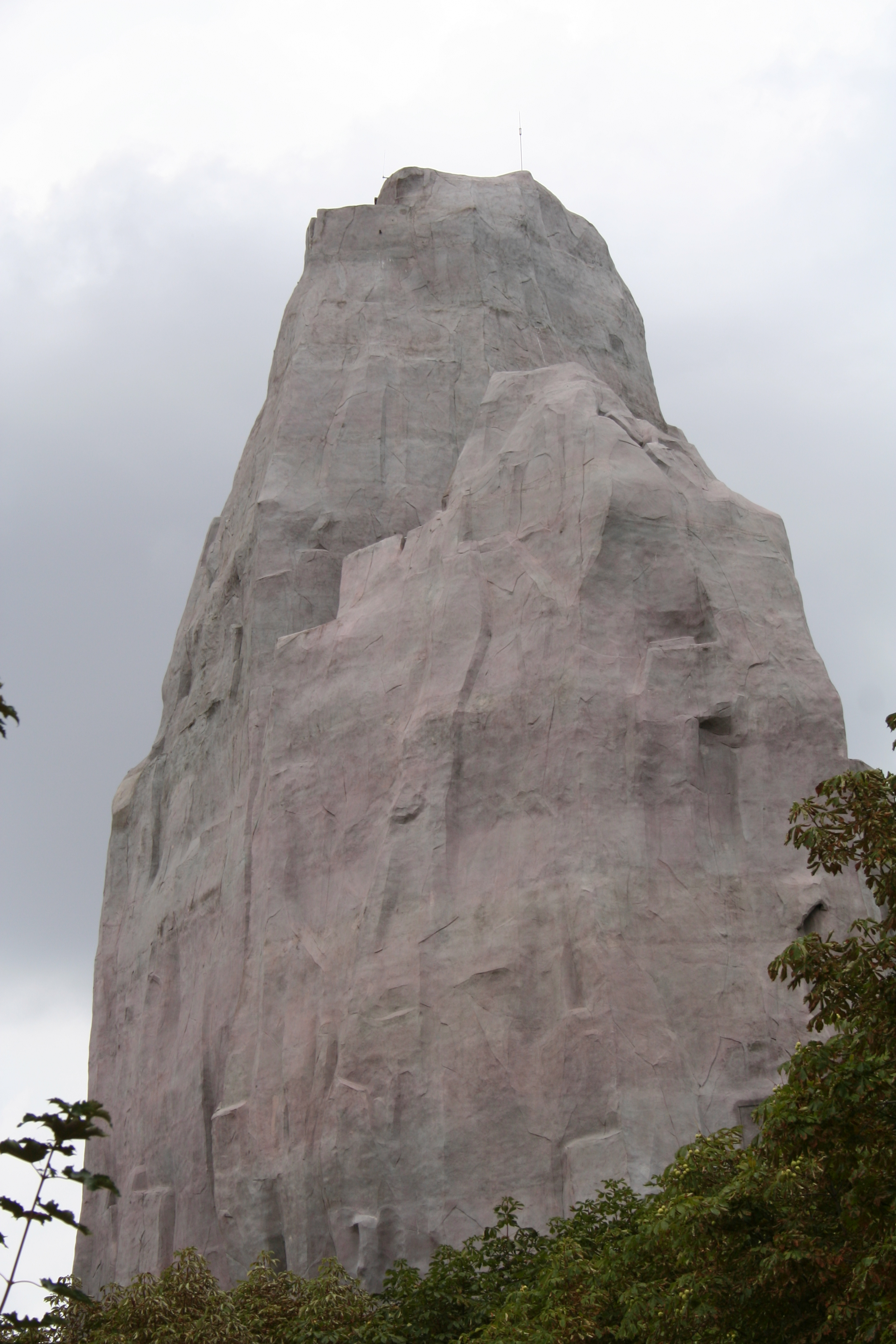
The famous rock of Vincennes zoo

== See also ==
- Château de Vincennes
- Vélodrome de Vincennes
- Communes of the Val-de-Marne department
