= Villecresnes =

- Commune
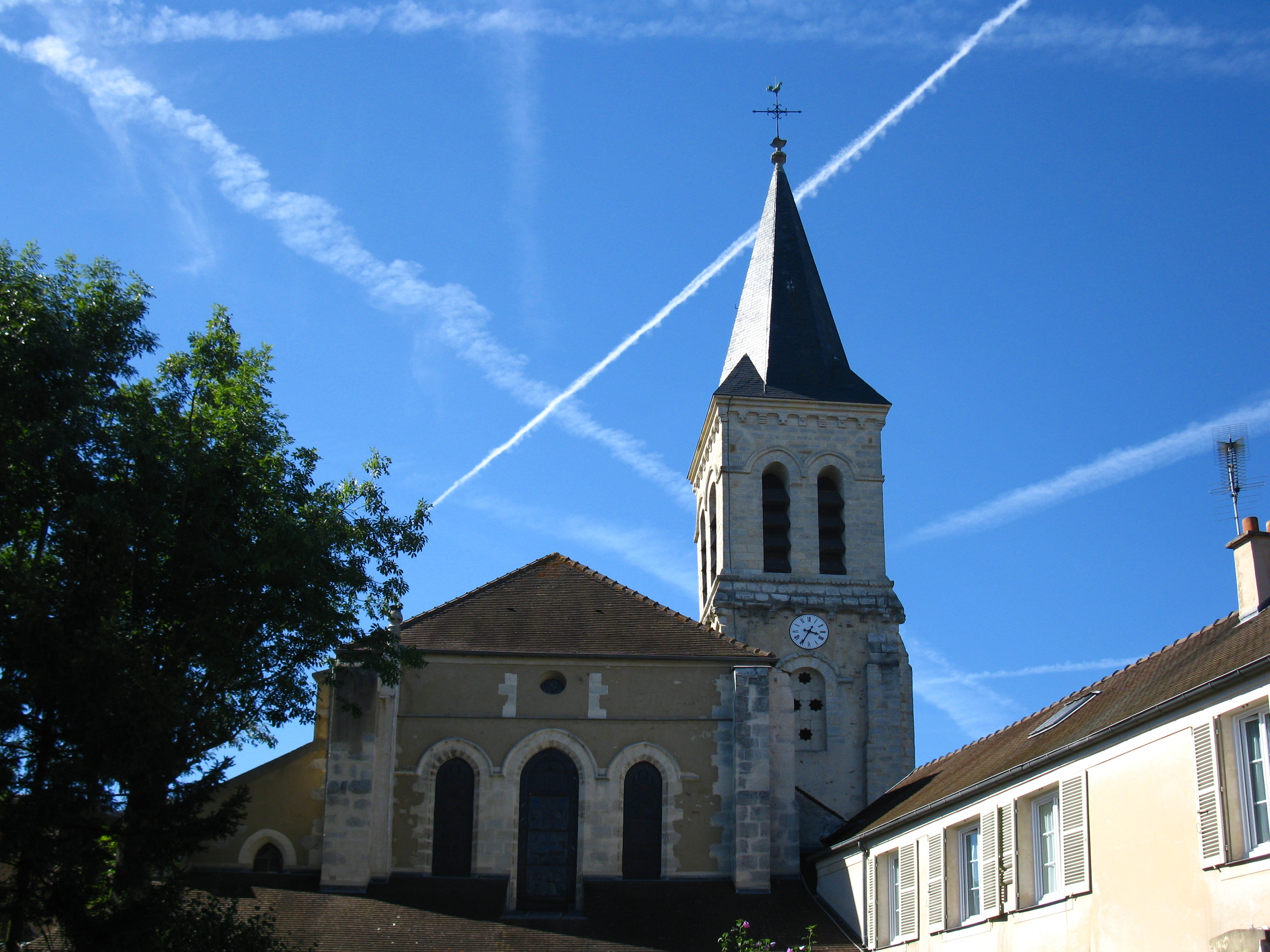
- The church of Notre-Dame, in Villecresnes

- Coat of arms

- Location (in red) within Paris inner suburbs
- Location of Villecresnes
- Location within France Location within Île-de-France (region)
- Coordinates: 48°43′17″N 2°32′03″E
- Country: France
- Region: Île-de-France
- Department: Val-de-Marne
- Arrondissement: Créteil
- Canton: Plateau briard
- Intercommunality: Grand Paris

Government
  - Mayor (2020–2026): Patrick Farcy
- Area^{1}: 5.62 km^{2} (2.17 sq mi)
- Highest elevation: 111 m (364 ft)
- Lowest elevation: 50 m (160 ft)
- Population (2023): 11,647
  - Density: 2,070/km^{2} (5,370/sq mi)
- Time zone: UTC+01:00 (CET)
  - Summer (DST): UTC+02:00 (CEST)
- INSEE/Postal code: 94075 /94440
- ^{1} French Land Register data, which excludes lakes, ponds, glaciers > 1 km^{2} (0.386 sq mi or 247 acres) and river estuaries.

Villecresnes (French pronunciation: [vil.kʁɛn]) is a commune in the southeastern suburbs of Paris, France. It is located 20.1 km (12.5 mi) from the center of Paris.

== Transport ==
Villecresnes is not served by a station of the Paris Métro, RER, or suburban rail network. The closest station to Villecresnes is Boissy-Saint-Léger station on Paris RER line A. This station is located in the neighboring commune of Boissy-Saint-Léger, 4 km (2.5 mi) from the town center of Villecresnes.

== Population ==
Historical population
| Year | Pop. | ±% p.a. |
|---|---|---|
| 1968 | 3,875 | — |
| 1975 | 6,053 | +6.58% |
| 1982 | 6,472 | +0.96% |
| 1990 | 7,921 | +2.56% |
| 1999 | 8,361 | +0.60% |
| 2007 | 9,295 | +1.33% |
| 2012 | 9,708 | +0.87% |
| 2017 | 10,458 | +1.50% |
| 2023 | 11,647 | +1.81% |
Source: INSEE

== Education ==
Schools in the commune include:

- Three public preschools (maternelles): du Château, des Fleurs, du Réveillon
- One public group of preschools/elementary schools: Mélanie Bonis
- One public elementary school: des Merles
- One public junior high school: Collège public La Guinette
- A private preschool: Le Petit cours

For high school students attend Lycée public Guillaume Budé in nearby Limeil-Brévannes.

== Notable residents ==
- Didier Pironi (1952–1987), racing driver, born in Villecresnes
- William Irigoyen (born 1970), journalist, born in Villecresnes
- Alexandra Lamy (born 1971), French actress, born in Villecresnes
- Romain Iannetta (born 1979), racing driver, born in Villecresnes

== Twin towns ==
- (Italy) Zibido San Giacomo, Italia since 2010
- Weißenhorn, Germany since 2010

== See also ==
- Communes of the Val-de-Marne department
