= Santeny =

- Commune
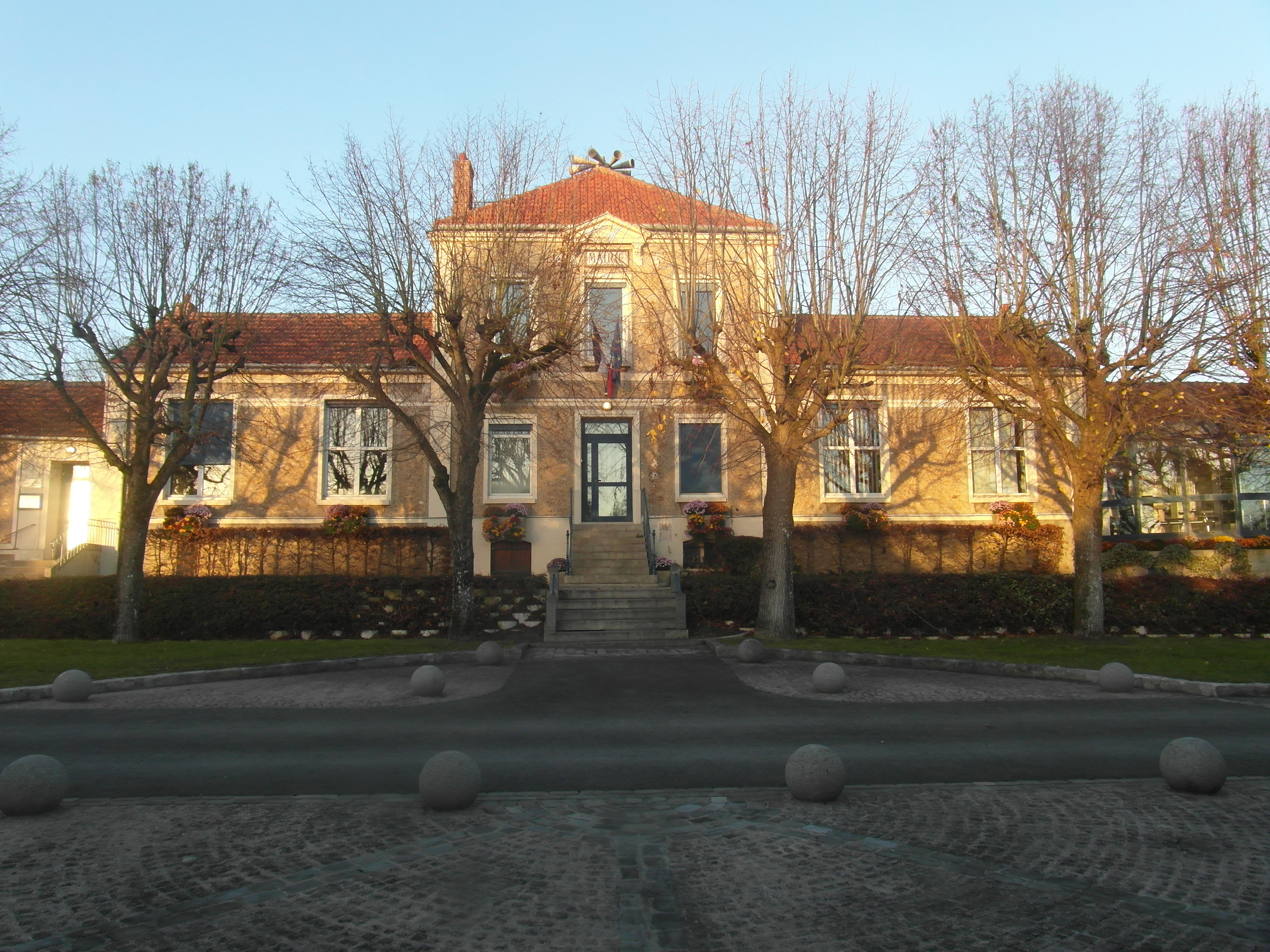
- The town hall of Santeny

- Coat of arms

- Location (in red) within Paris inner suburbs
- Location of Santeny
- Location within France Location within Île-de-France (region)
- Coordinates: 48°43′33″N 2°34′20″E
- Country: France
- Region: Île-de-France
- Department: Val-de-Marne
- Arrondissement: Créteil
- Canton: Plateau briard
- Intercommunality: Grand Paris

Government
  - Mayor (2026–32): Vincent Bedu
- Area^{1}: 9.91 km^{2} (3.83 sq mi)
- Highest elevation: 105 m (344 ft)
- Lowest elevation: 60 m (200 ft)
- Population (2023): 3,913
  - Density: 395/km^{2} (1,020/sq mi)
- Time zone: UTC+01:00 (CET)
  - Summer (DST): UTC+02:00 (CEST)
- INSEE/Postal code: 94070 /94440
- ^{1} French Land Register data, which excludes lakes, ponds, glaciers > 1 km^{2} (0.386 sq mi or 247 acres) and river estuaries.

Santeny (French pronunciation: [sɑ̃tni]) is a commune in the southeastern suburbs of Paris, France. It is located 21.8 km (13.5 mi) from the center of Paris.

== Transport ==
Santeny is served by no station of the Paris Métro, RER, or suburban rail network. The closest station to Santeny is Boissy-Saint-Léger station on Paris RER line A. This station is located in the commune of Boissy-Saint-Léger, 5.7 km (3.5 mi) from the town center of Santeny.

== Population ==
Historical population
Year	Pop.	±% p.a.
1968	774	—
1975	2,242	+16.41%
1982	2,621	+2.26%
1990	2,810	+0.87%
1999	3,140	+1.24%
2007	3,610	+1.76%
2012	3,651	+0.23%
2017	3,775	+0.67%
2023	3,913	+0.60%
Source: INSEE

== Education ==
Santeny has one consolidated preschool/nursery (maternelle) and elementary school: Groupe scolaire des 40 Arpents. The commune also has Collège Georges-Brassens, a public junior high school.

Area senior high schools/sixth-form colleges:

- Lycée Guillaume-Budé - Limeil-Brévannes
- Lycée Christophe-Colomb - Sucy-en-Brie
- Lycée des métiers hôteliers Montaleau - Sucy-en-Brie

== See also ==
- Communes of the Val-de-Marne department
