= Ormesson-sur-Marne =

- Commune
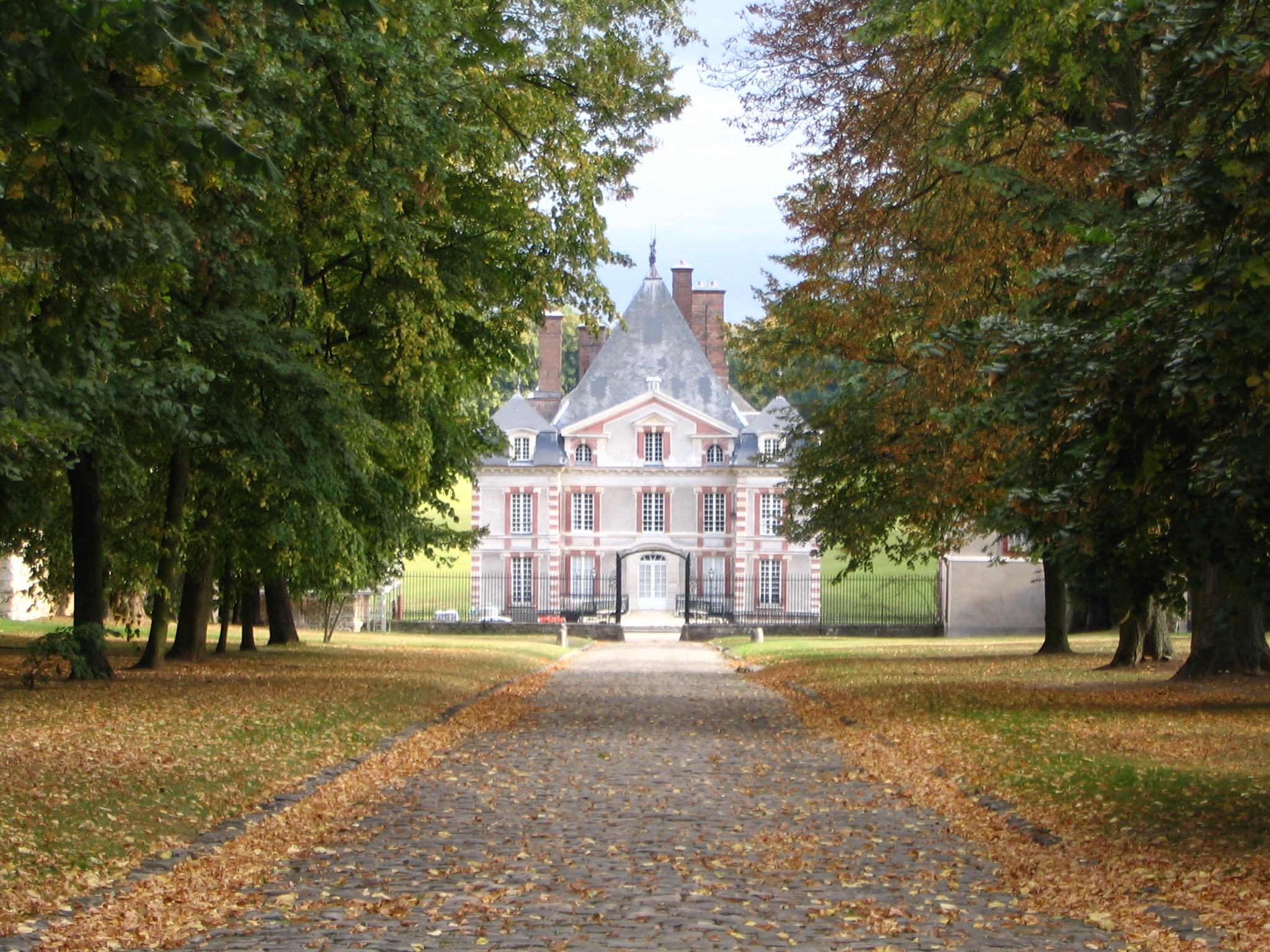
- The Château d'Ormesson-sur-Marne

- Coat of arms

- Location (in red) within Paris inner suburbs
- Location of Ormesson-sur-Marne
- Location within France Location within Île-de-France (region)
- Coordinates: 48°47′09″N 2°32′18″E
- Country: France
- Region: Île-de-France
- Department: Val-de-Marne
- Arrondissement: Nogent-sur-Marne
- Canton: Saint-Maur-des-Fossés-2
- Intercommunality: Grand Paris

Government
  - Mayor (2026–32): Marie-Christine Ségui
- Area^{1}: 3.41 km^{2} (1.32 sq mi)
- Population (2023): 10,977
  - Density: 3,220/km^{2} (8,340/sq mi)
- Demonym: Ormessonnais
- Time zone: UTC+01:00 (CET)
  - Summer (DST): UTC+02:00 (CEST)
- INSEE/Postal code: 94055 /94490
- ^{1} French Land Register data, which excludes lakes, ponds, glaciers > 1 km^{2} (0.386 sq mi or 247 acres) and river estuaries.

Ormesson-sur-Marne (French pronunciation: [ɔʁmɛsɔ̃ syʁ maʁn]; lit. 'Ormesson-on-Marne') is a commune in Val-de-Marne in the southeastern suburbs of Paris, France. It is located 16.1 km (10 mi) from the centre of Paris.

== Transport ==
Ormesson-sur-Marne is served by no station of the Paris Métro, RER, or suburban rail network. The closest stations to Ormesson-sur-Marne are two stations on Paris RER line A: Sucy – Bonneuil and La Varenne – Chennevières. The former is located in the neighboring commune of Sucy-en-Brie, 1.8 km (1.1 mi) from the town center of Ormesson-sur-Marne, and the latter is located in the neighboring commune of Saint-Maur-des-Fossés, 1.4 km (0.87 mi) from the town center of Ormesson-sur-Marne.

== Population ==
Historical population
Year	Pop.	±% p.a.
1968	8,277	—
1975	8,698	+0.71%
1982	8,674	−0.04%
1990	10,038	+1.84%
1999	9,793	−0.27%
2007	9,864	+0.09%
2012	9,945	+0.16%
2017	10,305	+0.71%
2023	10,977	+1.06%
Source: INSEE

== Education ==
Schools in the commune include:

- Preschools/nurseries: Ecole maternelle Anatole France, Ecole maternelle André le Nôtre, Ecole maternelle Jean de La Fontaine
- Elementary schools: Ecole élémentaire Anatole France, Ecole élémentaire André le Nôtre, Ecole élémentaire Jules Ferry
- Junior high school: Collège Antoine de Saint-Exupéry

High school/sixth-form students attend Lycée Samuel de Champlain in Chennevières-sur-Marne.

== Twinnings ==
As of July 2016, Ormesson-sur-Marne is twinned with Northallerton in North Yorkshire.

== See also ==
- Communes of the Val-de-Marne department

== Links ==
- Play at the Tennis Ormesson sur Marne
