= Noiseau =

- Commune
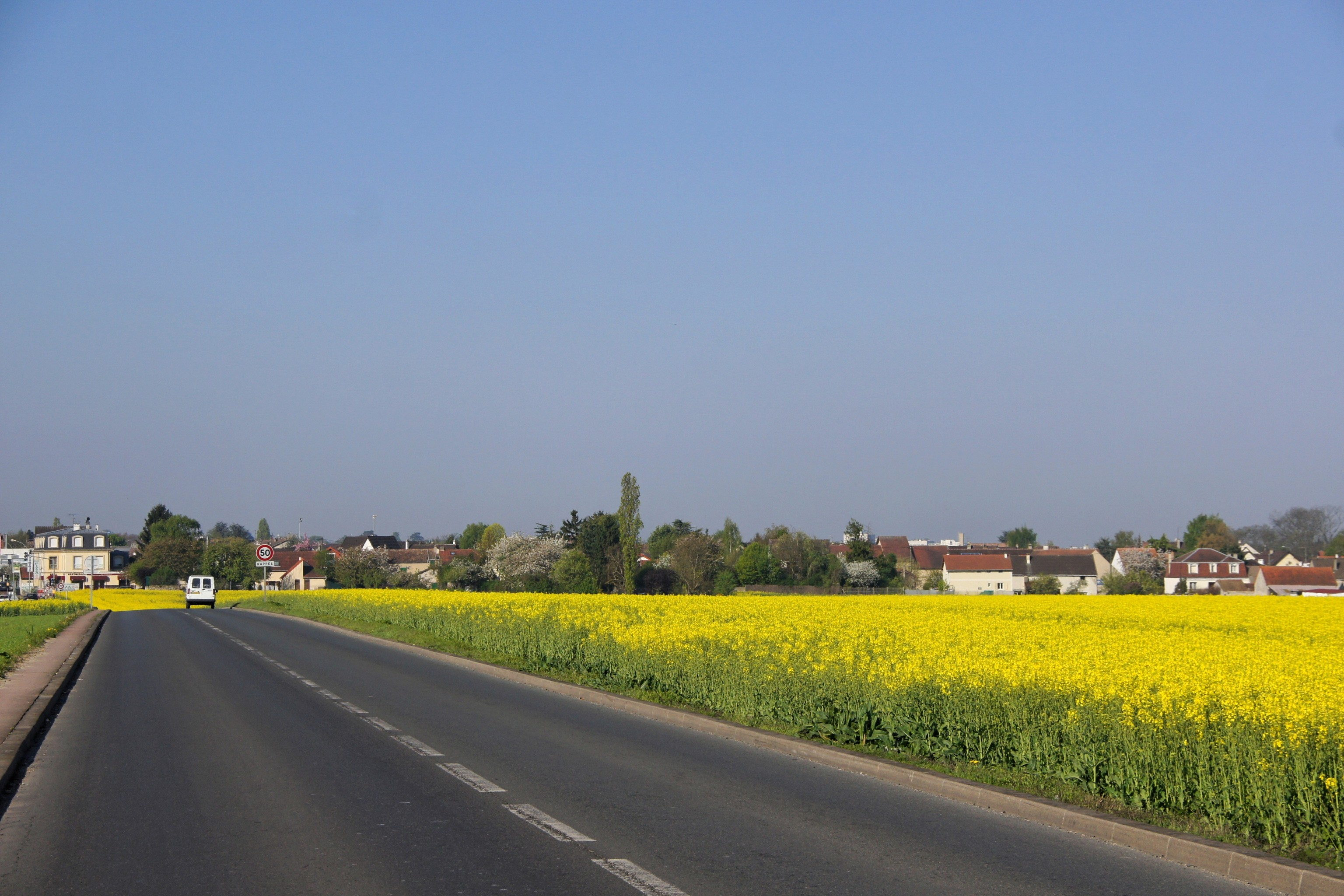
- Noiseau seen from the road to La Queue-en-Brie

- Coat of arms

- Location (in red) within Paris inner suburbs
- Location of Noiseau
- Location within France Location within Île-de-France (region)
- Coordinates: 48°46′37″N 2°32′50″E
- Country: France
- Region: Île-de-France
- Department: Val-de-Marne
- Arrondissement: Nogent-sur-Marne
- Canton: Plateau briard
- Intercommunality: Grand Paris

Government
  - Mayor (2026–32): Christophe Milot
- Area^{1}: 4.49 km^{2} (1.73 sq mi)
- Population (2023): 4,628
  - Density: 1,030/km^{2} (2,670/sq mi)
- Time zone: UTC+01:00 (CET)
  - Summer (DST): UTC+02:00 (CEST)
- INSEE/Postal code: 94053 /94880
- ^{1} French Land Register data, which excludes lakes, ponds, glaciers > 1 km^{2} (0.386 sq mi or 247 acres) and river estuaries.

Noiseau (French pronunciation: [nwazo]) is a commune in the southeastern suburbs of Paris, France. It is located 16.8 km (10.4 mi) from the center of Paris.

== Geography ==
Noiseau lies on the edge of the catchment area, about 17 kilometers south-southeast of Paris. The Morbras stream, which flows into the Marne, runs along the northern municipal boundary. Noiseau is surrounded by the neighboring municipalities of Ormesson-sur-Marne to the north, La Queue-en-Brie to the east, and Sucy-en-Brie to the south and west.

== Transport ==
Noiseau is served by no station of the Paris Métro, RER, or suburban rail network. The closest station to Noiseau is Sucy–Bonneuil station on Paris RER line A. This station is located in the neighboring commune of Sucy-en-Brie, 3.1 km (1.9 mi) from the town center of Noiseau.

== Population ==
Historical population
Year	Pop.	±% p.a.
1968	1,175	—
1975	1,809	+6.36%
1982	2,667	+5.70%
1990	2,831	+0.75%
1999	3,971	+3.83%
2007	4,375	+1.22%
2012	4,689	+1.40%
2017	4,651	−0.16%
2023	4,628	−0.08%
Source: INSEE

== Education ==
The commune has two primary schools, École maternelle Albert Camus (preschool/nursery school) and École élémentaire Jean-Jaurès.

Secondary schools in nearby communes:

- Junior high schools: Collège du Parc and Collège du Fort in Sucy-en-Brie
- Senior high schools/sixth-form colleges: Lycée Guillaume Budé in Limeil-Brévannes, Lycée Christophe Colomb and Lycée Montaleau in Sucy-en-Brie

== See also ==
- Communes of the Val-de-Marne department
