= Hôtel de Ville, Le Plessis-Trévise =

Town hall in Le Plessis-Trévise, France

Hôtel de Ville
- The main frontage of the Hôtel de Ville in September 2019

General information
- Type: City hall
- Architectural style: Second Empire style
- Location: Le Plessis-Trévise, France
- Coordinates: 48.8090°N 2.5728°E
- Completed: 1866

The Hôtel de Ville (French pronunciation: [otɛl də vil], City Hall) is a municipal building in Le Plessis-Trévise, Val-de-Marne, in the eastern suburbs of Paris, standing on Avenue Ardouin. It has been included on the Inventaire général des monuments by the French Ministry of Culture since 1986.

== History ==
The old combined town hall and school

=== The old town hall ===
After the commune of Le Plessis-Trévise was formed in July 1899, the new town council led by the mayor, Gustave Dupont, decided to commission a combined town hall and school. The site they selected was on the southwest side of Avenue Gonzalve (now Avenue du Général de Gaulle). The building was designed in the neoclassical style, built in rubble masonry with red brick finishings and was completed in 1900. It was expanded to accommodate a post office in 1902.

The design involved an asymmetrical main frontage of seven bays facing onto the street. The third bay on the left, which was slightly projected forward, contained a segmental-headed doorway on the ground floor, a segmental-headed window on the first floor and a stepped gable above. The two bays on the left were fenestrated by paired segmental-headed windows on the ground floor and by single segmental-headed windows on the first floor, while the bays on the right contained a doorway in the first bay and segmental-headed windows in the other bays on the ground floor and in all bays on the first floor. The classrooms were on the ground floor, and the municipal office was on the first floor. After the building was no longer required for municipal use, it continued to serve as a school, becoming known as the École du Centre and, later, the École Elémentaire Publique Marie Louise et Marcel Salmon. After being refurbished in 2010, it became known as the Espace Georges Roussillon, and became home to the Centre Communal d'Action Sociale (CCAS) from September 2021.

=== The current town hall ===
In the early 1920s, the council led by the mayor, Joseph Belin, decided to acquire a more substantial building for municipal use. The building they selected was the Ferme de la Grande Grille (Great Gate Farm), also known as the Propriètè Collet (Collet Property), on what is now Avenue Ardouin. The building had been commissioned as a private residence. It had been designed in the Second Empire style, built in brick with a cement render finish and had been completed in 1866.

The original design involved a symmetrical main frontage of five bays facing onto the street. The central bay, which was slightly projected forward, featured a double forestair leading up to a square-headed doorway on the ground floor. There was window with a triangular pediment on the first floor and a tri-partite window with another pediment at attic level. The central bay was flanked by Doric order pilasters supporting a cornice and a mansard roof. The other bays were fenestrated in a similar style. The building was acquired by the council in 1924 and three-bay wings were added on both sides in 1982. Internally, the principal room was the Salle du Conseil (council chamber).
