= La Queue-en-Brie =

- Commune
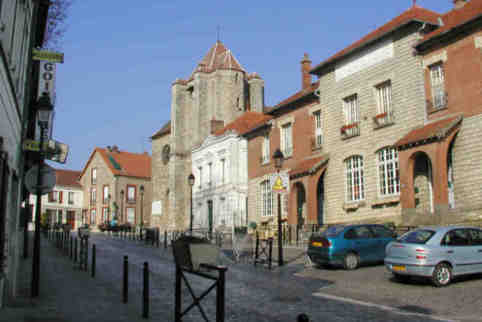
- The old village of La Queue-en-Brie

- Coat of arms

- Location (in red) within Paris inner suburbs
- Location of La Queue-en-Brie
- Location within France Location within Île-de-France (region)
- Coordinates: 48°47′24″N 2°34′39″E
- Country: France
- Region: Île-de-France
- Department: Val-de-Marne
- Arrondissement: Créteil
- Canton: Plateau briard
- Intercommunality: Grand Paris

Government
  - Mayor (2026–32): Karine Bastier
- Area^{1}: 9.16 km^{2} (3.54 sq mi)
- Highest elevation: 107 m (351 ft)
- Lowest elevation: 69 m (226 ft)
- Population (2023): 12,241
  - Density: 1,340/km^{2} (3,460/sq mi)
- Time zone: UTC+01:00 (CET)
  - Summer (DST): UTC+02:00 (CEST)
- INSEE/Postal code: 94060 /94510
- ^{1} French Land Register data, which excludes lakes, ponds, glaciers > 1 km^{2} (0.386 sq mi or 247 acres) and river estuaries.

La Queue-en-Brie (French: [la kø ɑ̃ bʁi], literally La Queue in Brie) is a commune in the southeastern suburbs of Paris, France. It is located 17.9 km (11.1 mi) from the center of Paris.

== History ==
On 7 July 1899, a part of the territory of La Queue-en-Brie was detached and merged with a part of the territory of Chennevières-sur-Marne and a part of the territory of Villiers-sur-Marne to create the commune of Le Plessis-Trévise. Until 2024, La Queue-en-Brie had a city farm within it before it was closed due to the pick your own business running it being liquidated. The municipality stated that they aim that the new owners would maintain its agricultural market garden environment.

== Population ==
Historical population
Year	Pop.	±% p.a.
1968	3,009	—
1975	7,140	+13.14%
1982	9,722	+4.51%
1990	9,897	+0.22%
1999	10,852	+1.03%
2007	11,392	+0.61%
2012	11,733	+0.59%
2017	11,931	+0.34%
2023	12,241	+0.43%
Source: INSEE

== Transport ==
La Queue-en-Brie is served by no station of the Paris Métro, RER, or suburban rail network. The closest station to La Queue-en-Brie is Émerainville – Pontault-Combault station on Paris RER line E. This station is located in the neighboring commune of Pontault-Combault, 3.7 km (2.3 mi) from the town center of La Queue-en-Brie.

== Education ==
The commune has five groups of primary schools (each having preschools/nurseries (maternelles) and elementary schools), with a combined total of 1,500 students. There are four preschools and five elementary schools. The school groups Pauline Kergomard, Jean Zay, and Lamartine each have a preschool and elementary. Gournay is preschool only, while Pasteur and Jean Jaures are elementary only.

Collège Jean Moulin serves as the communal junior high school. Senior high/sixth-form students are served by Lycée Champlain in Chennevières-sur-Marne.

== See also ==
- Communes of the Val-de-Marne department
