= Cantons of Créteil =

Coordinates: 48.79°N 2.46°E

The cantons of Créteil are administrative divisions of the Val-de-Marne department, Île-de-France region, northern France. Since the French canton reorganisation which came into effect in March 2015, the city of Créteil is subdivided into 2 cantons. Their seat is in Créteil.

== Population ==
Name	Population (2019)	Cantonal Code
Canton of Créteil-1	47,344	9407
Canton of Créteil-2	45,902	9408
