= Canton of Plateau briard =

Coordinates: 48.75°N 2.51°E

The canton of Plateau briard is an administrative division of the Val-de-Marne department, Île-de-France region, northern France. It was created at the French canton reorganisation which came into effect in March 2015. Its seat is in Boissy-Saint-Léger.

It consists of the following communes:

1. Boissy-Saint-Léger
2. Mandres-les-Roses
3. Marolles-en-Brie
4. Noiseau
5. Périgny
6. La Queue-en-Brie
7. Santeny
8. Villecresnes
