= Canton of Ivry-sur-Seine =

Coordinates: 48.81°N 2.39°E

The canton of Ivry-sur-Seine is an administrative division of the Val-de-Marne department, Île-de-France region, northern France. It was created at the French canton reorganisation which came into effect in March 2015. Its seat is in Ivry-sur-Seine.

It consists of the following communes:

1. Ivry-sur-Seine
