= Canton of Villejuif =

Canton of the Val-de-Marne department, France

Coordinates: 48.79°N 2.36°E

The canton of Villejuif is an administrative division of the Val-de-Marne department, Île-de-France region, northern France. It was created at the French canton reorganisation which came into effect in March 2015. Its seat is in Villejuif.

It consists of the following communes:

1. Villejuif
