= Arrondissement of Nogent-sur-Marne =

Coordinates: 48°50′11″N 2°28′44″E

Nogent-sur-Marne
- Arrondissement
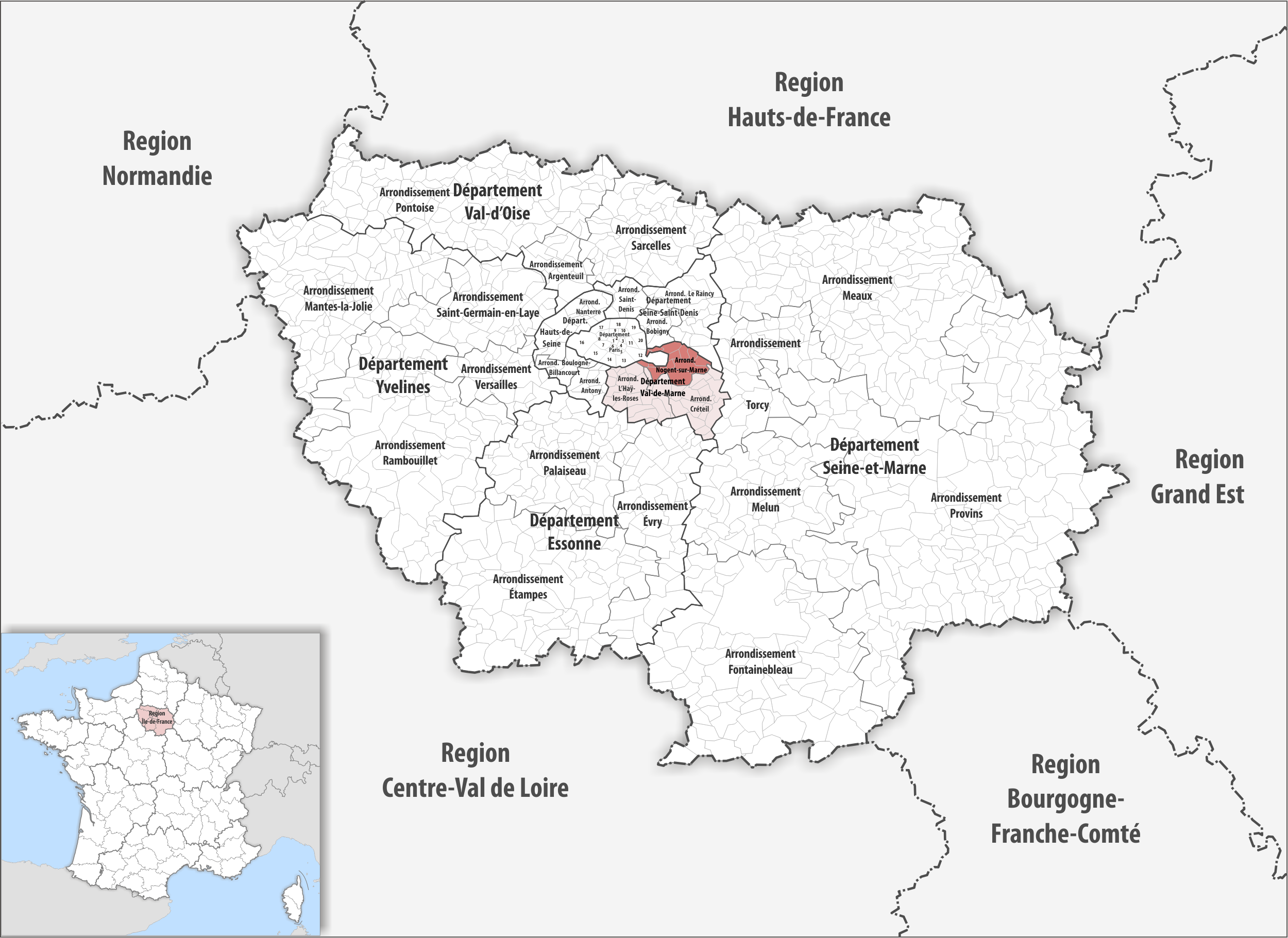
- Location within the region Île-de-France
- Country: France
- Region: Île-de-France
- Department: Val-de-Marne
- No. of communes: 13
- Area: 56.3 km^{2} (21.7 sq mi)
- Population (2023): 517,705
  - Density: 9,200/km^{2} (23,800/sq mi)
- INSEE code: 942

The arrondissement of Nogent-sur-Marne is an arrondissement of France in the Val-de-Marne departement in the Île-de-France region. It has 13 communes. Its population is 513,253 (2021), and its area is 56.3 km^{2} (21.7 sq mi).

== Composition ==
The communes of the arrondissement of Nogent-sur-Marne, and their INSEE codes, are:

1. Bry-sur-Marne (94015)
2. Champigny-sur-Marne (94017)
3. Charenton-le-Pont (94018)
4. Fontenay-sous-Bois (94033)
5. Joinville-le-Pont (94042)
6. Maisons-Alfort (94046)
7. Nogent-sur-Marne (94052)
8. Le Perreux-sur-Marne (94058)
9. Saint-Mandé (94067)
10. Saint-Maur-des-Fossés (94068)
11. Saint-Maurice (94069)
12. Villiers-sur-Marne (94079)
13. Vincennes (94080)

== History ==
The arrondissement of Nogent-sur-Marne was created in 1966 as part of the department Seine. In 1968 it became part of the new department Val-de-Marne. On 25 February 2017, it lost 3 communes to and gained 2 communes from the arrondissement of Créteil.

As a result of the reorganisation of the cantons of France which came into effect in 2015, the borders of the cantons are no longer related to the borders of the arrondissements. The cantons of the arrondissement of Nogent-sur-Marne were, as of January 2015:

1. Bry-sur-Marne
2. Champigny-sur-Marne-Centre
3. Champigny-sur-Marne-Est
4. Champigny-sur-Marne-Ouest
5. Chennevières-sur-Marne
6. Fontenay-sous-Bois-Est
7. Fontenay-sous-Bois-Ouest
8. Joinville-le-Pont
9. Nogent-sur-Marne
10. Ormesson-sur-Marne
11. Le Perreux-sur-Marne
12. Saint-Mandé
13. Villiers-sur-Marne
14. Vincennes-Est
15. Vincennes-Ouest
