= Canton of Alfortville =

Coordinates: 48.80°N 2.42°E

The canton of Alfortville is an administrative division of the Val-de-Marne department, Île-de-France region, northern France. It was created at the French canton reorganisation which came into effect in March 2015. Its seat is in Alfortville.

It consists of the following communes:

1. Alfortville
