= Cantons of Vitry-sur-Seine =

Coordinates: 48.79°N 2.40°E

The cantons of Vitry-sur-Seine are administrative divisions of the Val-de-Marne department, Île-de-France region, northern France. Since the French canton reorganisation which came into effect in March 2015, the city of Vitry-sur-Seine is subdivided into 2 cantons. Their seat is in Vitry-sur-Seine.

== Population ==
Name	Population (2019)	Cantonal Code
Canton of Vitry-sur-Seine-1	48,752	9424
Canton of Vitry-sur-Seine-2	46,758	9425
