= Canton of Fontenay-sous-Bois =

Coordinates: 48.85°N 2.47°E

The canton of Fontenay-sous-Bois is an administrative division of the Val-de-Marne department, Île-de-France region, northern France. It was created at the French canton reorganisation which came into effect in March 2015. Its seat is in Fontenay-sous-Bois.

It consists of the following communes:

1. Fontenay-sous-Bois
2. Vincennes (partly)
