= Mandres-les-Roses =

- Commune
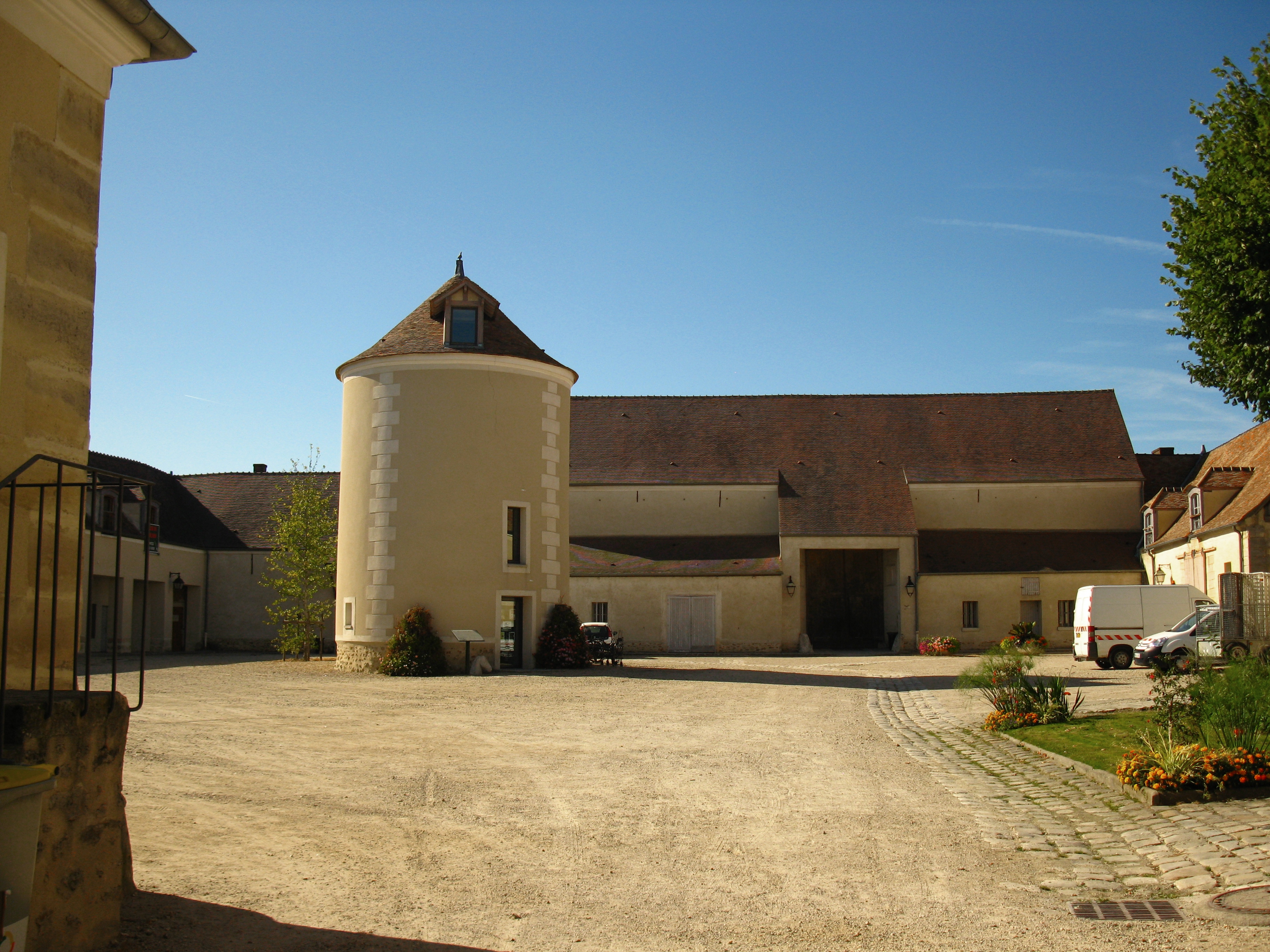
- The Ferme de Monsieur, an historic monument in Mandres-les-Roses

- Coat of arms

- Location (in red) within Paris inner suburbs
- Location of Mandres-les-Roses
- Location within France Location within Île-de-France (region)
- Coordinates: 48°42′08″N 2°32′40″E
- Country: France
- Region: Île-de-France
- Department: Val-de-Marne
- Arrondissement: Créteil
- Canton: Plateau briard
- Intercommunality: Grand Paris

Government
  - Mayor (2026–32): Nathalie Guesdon
- Area^{1}: 3.3 km^{2} (1.3 sq mi)
- Population (2023): 4,922
  - Density: 1,500/km^{2} (3,900/sq mi)
- Demonym: Mandrions
- Time zone: UTC+01:00 (CET)
  - Summer (DST): UTC+02:00 (CEST)
- INSEE/Postal code: 94047 /94520
- Website: www.mandreslesroses.fr
- ^{1} French Land Register data, which excludes lakes, ponds, glaciers > 1 km^{2} (0.386 sq mi or 247 acres) and river estuaries.

Mandres-les-Roses (French pronunciation: [mɑ̃dʁ le ʁoz]; lit. 'Mandres-the-Roses') is a commune in the southeastern suburbs of Paris, France. It is located in Val-de-Marne, 22.1 km (13.7 mi) from the centre of Paris, on the departmental border with both Essonne and Seine-et-Marne. The palaeographer and archivist Robert Marichal (1904–1999) was born in Mandres-les-Roses.

== Toponymy ==
'Mandres' derives from the Latin word mandra, meaning 'hut'. During the Middle Ages, the area was occupied by temporary shepherds' huts and later by hermits. The commune became known for rose cultivation, and roses from the commune were shipped by train to Paris. The commune of Mandres officially adopted the name Mandres-les-Roses in 1958.

== Climate ==
Mandres-les-Roses has an oceanic climate (Köppen climate classification Cfb). The average annual temperature in Mandres-les-Roses is 11.9 °C (53.4 °F). The average annual rainfall is 698.3 mm (27.49 in) with December as the wettest month. The temperatures are highest on average in July, at around 20.2 °C (68.4 °F), and lowest in January, at around 4.5 °C (40.1 °F). The highest temperature ever recorded in Mandres-les-Roses was 40.1 °C (104.2 °F) on 6 August 2003; the coldest temperature ever recorded was −16.0 °C (3.2 °F) on 8 January 2010.

Climate data for Mandres-les-Roses (1991−2020 normals, extremes 1988−2021)
Month	Jan	Feb	Mar	Apr	May	Jun	Jul	Aug	Sep	Oct	Nov	Dec	Year
Record high °C (°F)	16.1 (61.0)	22.0 (71.6)	25.0 (77.0)	29.0 (84.2)	33.0 (91.4)	38.0 (100.4)	39.5 (103.1)	40.1 (104.2)	35.0 (95.0)	29.5 (85.1)	23.0 (73.4)	17.3 (63.1)	40.1 (104.2)
Mean daily maximum °C (°F)	7.2 (45.0)	8.6 (47.5)	12.7 (54.9)	16.4 (61.5)	19.9 (67.8)	23.5 (74.3)	25.9 (78.6)	26.1 (79.0)	21.8 (71.2)	16.6 (61.9)	10.9 (51.6)	7.5 (45.5)	16.4 (61.5)
Daily mean °C (°F)	4.5 (40.1)	5.0 (41.0)	8.2 (46.8)	11.0 (51.8)	14.8 (58.6)	18.1 (64.6)	20.2 (68.4)	20.0 (68.0)	16.3 (61.3)	12.4 (54.3)	7.8 (46.0)	5.0 (41.0)	11.9 (53.4)
Mean daily minimum °C (°F)	1.8 (35.2)	1.6 (34.9)	3.8 (38.8)	5.8 (42.4)	9.6 (49.3)	12.7 (54.9)	14.5 (58.1)	14.0 (57.2)	10.8 (51.4)	8.2 (46.8)	4.7 (40.5)	2.4 (36.3)	7.5 (45.5)
Record low °C (°F)	−16.0 (3.2)	−13.0 (8.6)	−10.5 (13.1)	−3.0 (26.6)	0.5 (32.9)	1.8 (35.2)	6.1 (43.0)	6.0 (42.8)	1.0 (33.8)	−3.8 (25.2)	−10.4 (13.3)	−10.3 (13.5)	−16.0 (3.2)
Average precipitation mm (inches)	57.2 (2.25)	50.9 (2.00)	49.8 (1.96)	50.6 (1.99)	67.4 (2.65)	58.6 (2.31)	60.0 (2.36)	61.1 (2.41)	52.4 (2.06)	58.0 (2.28)	61.8 (2.43)	70.5 (2.78)	698.3 (27.49)
Average precipitation days (≥ 1.0 mm)	11.6	10.7	9.8	9.0	9.7	8.9	8.2	8.2	8.0	10.0	11.4	13.0	118.4
Source: Météo-France

== Transport ==
Mandres-les-Roses is not served by the Réseau Express Régional (RER) or Transilien suburban rail network. The closest station to Mandres-les-Roses is Boussy-Saint-Antoine station on RER Line D. This station is located in the neighbouring commune of Boussy-Saint-Antoine, 2.5 km (1.6 mi) from the town centre of Mandres-les-Roses.

== Education ==
There are three schools in the commune: the École maternelle de la Ferme-de-Monsieur, the École élémentaire Les Charmilles, and the Collège Simone-Veil.

== Population ==
Historical population
Year	Pop.	±% p.a.
1968	1,496	—
1975	1,896	+3.44%
1982	2,386	+3.34%
1990	3,703	+5.65%
1999	4,117	+1.18%
2007	4,307	+0.57%
2012	4,407	+0.46%
2017	4,755	+1.53%
2023	4,922	+0.58%
Source: INSEE

== See also ==
- Communes of the Val-de-Marne department
