= Canton of Saint-Maur-des-Fossés-2 =

Coordinates: 48.79°N 2.50°E

The canton of Saint-Maur-des-Fossés-2 is an administrative division of the Val-de-Marne department, Île-de-France region, northern France. It was created at the French canton reorganisation which came into effect in March 2015. Its seat is in Saint-Maur-des-Fossés.

It consists of the following communes:

1. Bonneuil-sur-Marne
2. Ormesson-sur-Marne
3. Saint-Maur-des-Fossés (partly)
4. Sucy-en-Brie
