= Canton of Maisons-Alfort =

Administrative division in Val-de-Marne, France

Coordinates: 48.81°N 2.44°E

The canton of Maisons-Alfort is an administrative division of the Val-de-Marne department, Île-de-France region, northern France. It was created at the French canton reorganisation which came into effect in March 2015. Its seat is in Maisons-Alfort.

It consists of the following communes:

1. Maisons-Alfort
