= Canton of Villiers-sur-Marne =

Coordinates: 48.83°N 2.54°E

The canton of Villiers-sur-Marne is an administrative division of the Val-de-Marne department, Île-de-France region, northern France. Its borders were modified at the French canton reorganisation which came into effect in March 2015. Its seat is in Villiers-sur-Marne.

It consists of the following communes:

1. Bry-sur-Marne
2. Le Plessis-Trévise
3. Villiers-sur-Marne
