= Canton of L'Haÿ-les-Roses =

Coordinates: 48.78°N 2.34°E

The canton of L'Haÿ-les-Roses is an administrative division of the Val-de-Marne department, Île-de-France region, northern France. Its borders were modified at the French canton reorganisation which came into effect in March 2015. Its seat is in L'Haÿ-les-Roses.

It consists of the following communes:

1. Fresnes
2. L'Haÿ-les-Roses
