= Canton of Le Kremlin-Bicêtre =

Administrative region in northern France

Coordinates: 48.81°N 2.36°E

The canton of Le Kremlin-Bicêtre is an administrative division of the Val-de-Marne department, Île-de-France region, northern France. Its borders were modified at the French canton reorganisation which came into effect in March 2015. Its seat is in Le Kremlin-Bicêtre.

It consists of the following communes:

1. Gentilly
2. Le Kremlin-Bicêtre
