= Canton of Villeneuve-Saint-Georges =

Coordinates: 48.75°N 2.45°E

The canton of Villeneuve-Saint-Georges is an administrative division of the Val-de-Marne department, Île-de-France region, northern France. Its borders were modified at the French canton reorganisation which came into effect in March 2015. Its seat is in Villeneuve-Saint-Georges.

It consists of the following communes:

1. Limeil-Brévannes
2. Valenton
3. Villeneuve-Saint-Georges (partly)
