= Canton of Vincennes =

Administrative division of the French government

Coordinates: 48.85°N 2.44°E

The canton of Vincennes is an administrative division of the Val-de-Marne department, Île-de-France region, northern France. It was created at the French canton reorganisation which came into effect in March 2015. Its seat is in Vincennes.

It consists of the following communes:

1. Saint-Mandé
2. Vincennes (partly)
