= Canton of Thiais =

Coordinates: 48.76°N 2.39°E

The canton of Thiais is an administrative division of the Val-de-Marne department, Île-de-France region, northern France. Its borders were modified at the French canton reorganisation which came into effect in March 2015. Its seat is in Thiais.

It consists of the following communes:

1. Chevilly-Larue
2. Rungis
3. Thiais
