= Canton of Charenton-le-Pont =

Coordinates: 48.82°N 2.41°E

The canton of Charenton-le-Pont is an administrative division of the Val-de-Marne department, Île-de-France region, northern France. Its borders were modified at the French canton reorganisation which came into effect in March 2015. Its seat is in Charenton-le-Pont.

It consists of the following communes:

1. Charenton-le-Pont
2. Joinville-le-Pont
3. Nogent-sur-Marne (partly)
4. Saint-Maurice
