= Canton of Orly =

Coordinates: 48.74°N 2.40°E

The Canton of Orly (French: canton d'Orly) is an administrative division of the Val-de-Marne department, Île-de-France region, northern France. Its borders were modified at the French canton reorganisation which came into effect in March 2015. Its seat is in Orly.

It consists of the following communes:

1. Ablon-sur-Seine
2. Orly
3. Villeneuve-le-Roi
