= Canton of Choisy-le-Roi =

Coordinates: 48.76°N 2.41°E

The canton of Choisy-le-Roi is an administrative division of the Val-de-Marne department, Île-de-France region, northern France. Its borders were modified at the French canton reorganisation which came into effect in March 2015. Its seat is in Choisy-le-Roi.

It consists of the following communes:

1. Choisy-le-Roi
2. Villeneuve-Saint-Georges (partly)
