= Hôtel de Ville, Bagneux =

Town hall in Bagneux, France

Hôtel de Ville
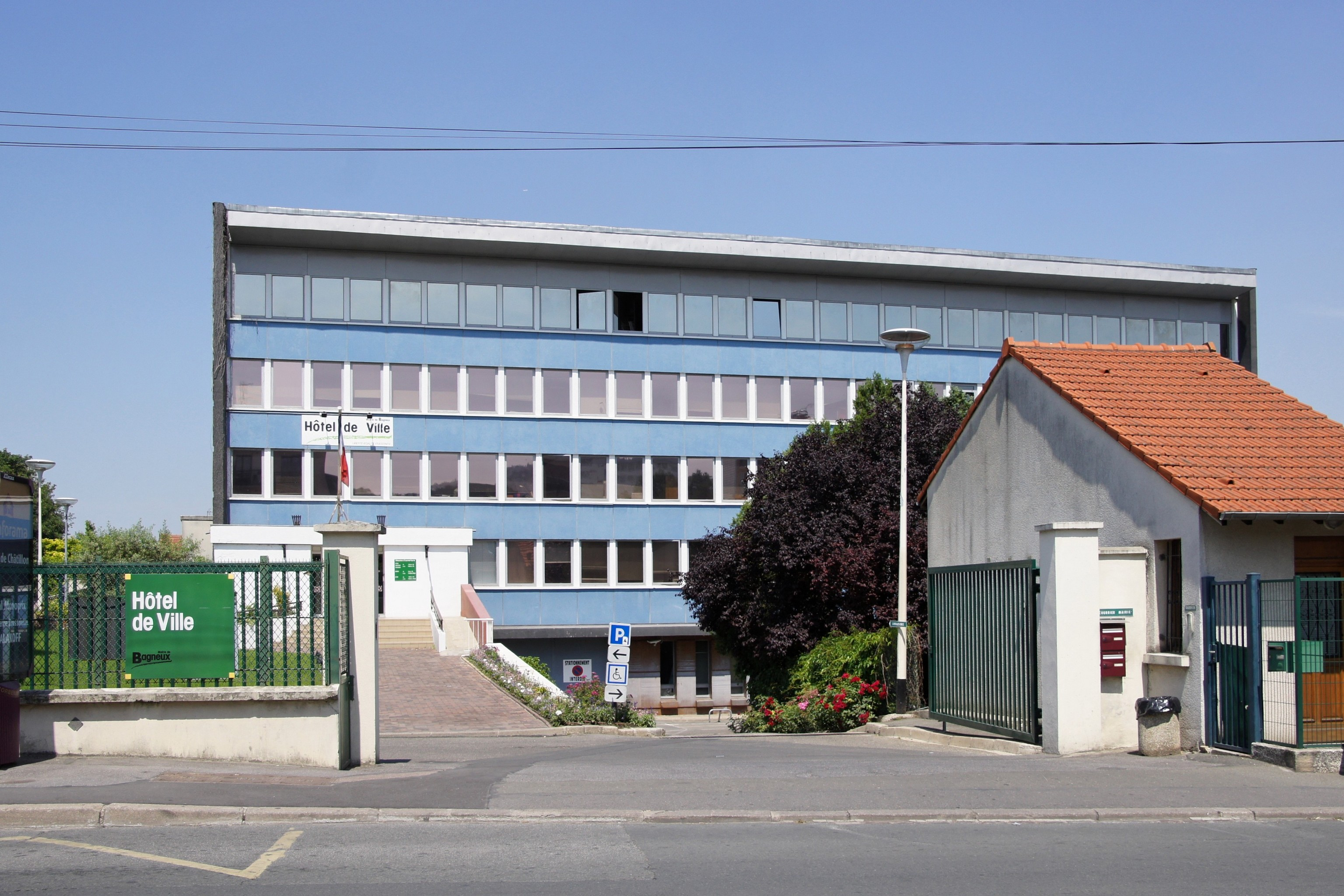
- The main frontage of the Hôtel de Ville in June 2010
- Interactive map of the Hôtel de Ville area

General information
- Type: City hall
- Architectural style: Modern style
- Location: Bagneux, France
- Coordinates: 48.7991°N 2.3042°E
- Completed: 1959

The Hôtel de Ville (French pronunciation: [otɛl də vil], City Hall) is a municipal building in Bagneux, Hauts-de-Seine, in the southern suburbs of Paris, standing on Avenue Henri Ravera.

== History ==
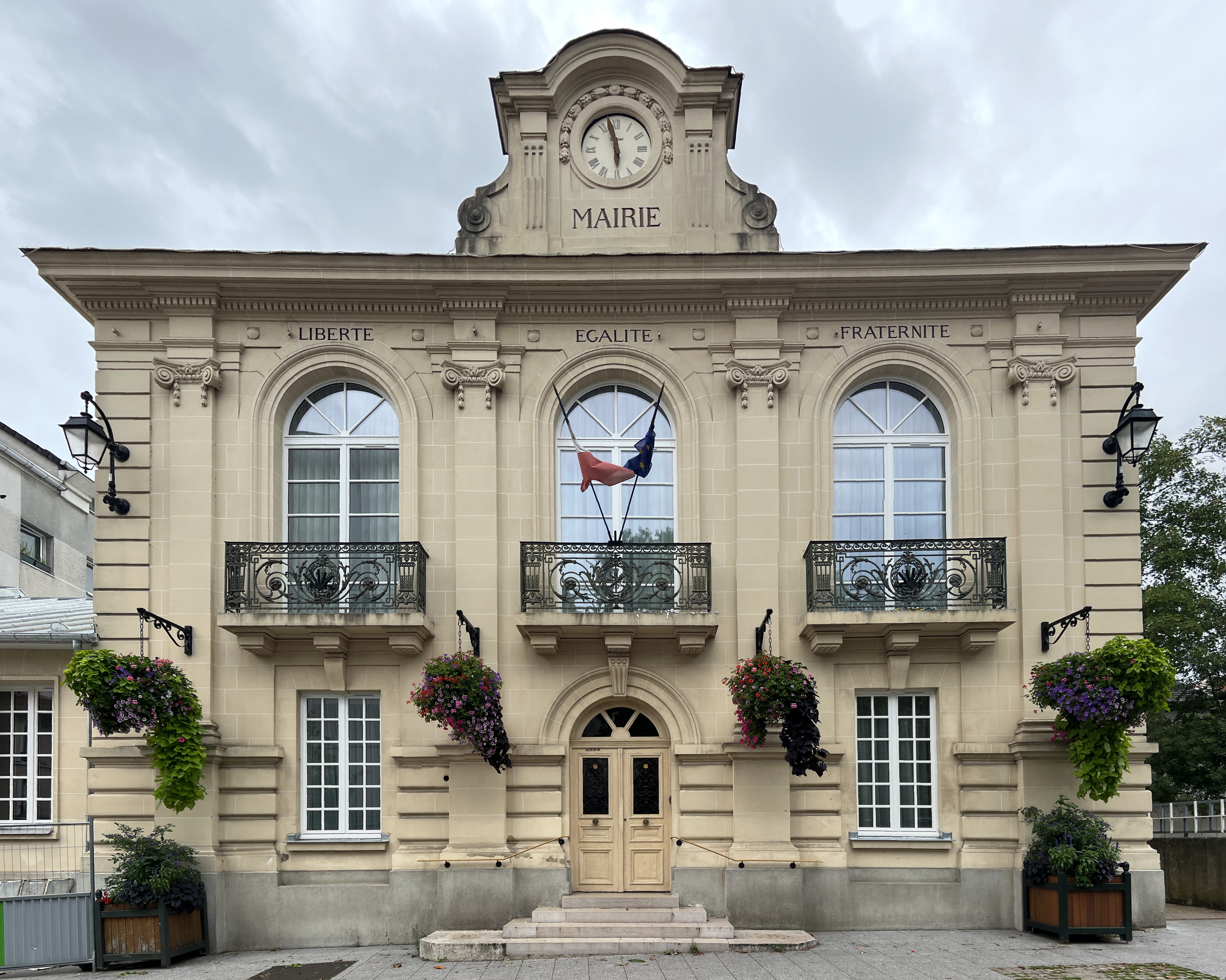
The old Town hall

Following the French Revolution, the town council initially met at the home of the mayor at the time. In 1873, the council led by the mayor, Philippe Auguste Leviaux, decided to commission a dedicated town hall. The site they selected was on the west side of Rue Pavée (now Rue de la Mairie). The building was designed by Jacques Paul Lequeux in the neoclassical style, built in ashlar stone and was completed in 1875.

The design involved a symmetrical main frontage of three bays facing onto Rue Pavée. The central bay featured a round headed doorway with a moulded surround and a keystone. On the ground floor, the outer bays were fenestrated by slightly recessed casement windows with keystones. On the first floor, there were three round headed windows with moulded surrounds, fronted by balconies with iron railings. All three bays were all flanked by full height Ionic order pilasters supporting a modillioned cornice. Above the central bay, there was a clock flanked by pilasters supporting a semi-circular pediment. Internally, the principal room was the Salle des Mariages (wedding room). Works of art installed in the late 19th century and early 20th century included a landscape by Eugène Victor Bourgeois entitled "Paysage de Bagneux en direction du Bois de Verrières" ("Landscape of Bagneux towards the Bois de Verrières") and a painting by Paul Steck entitled "Les Vignes de Bagneux au soleil couchant" ("The Vineyards of Bagneux at sunset").

During the Second World War, members of the French Resistance including Henri Ravera, Henri Cros, and André Ox re-captured the town hall on 19 August 1944. Barricades were erected around the town and André Ox was killed in the fighting before the German troops were driven out on 24 August 1944.

In the mid-1970s, after the old town hall became too cramped, the council led by the mayor, Henri Ravera, decided to establish a new town hall. Because of economic constraints, the council sought to acquire an existing building rather than to commission a purpose-built structure. The building they selected was on the north side of what is now Avenue Henri Ravera. The building had been commissioned by the oilfield services business, Schlumberger. It was designed in the modern style, built in concrete and glass and was completed in 1959. The design involved a wide main frontage facing onto Avenue Henri Ravera. The building, which was originally just three storeys high, was clad with glass tiles. During the 1960s and early 1970s, it was used by the company as offices and laboratories for the manufacture and sale of utility meters. After the company vacated the building in 1977, it was acquired by the council, increased in height by two storeys and, over the next two years, converted for municipal use. The main frontage was faced with alternating bands of painted concrete and windows. Between 1979 and 1981, all the council departments became collocated in the building.

A piece of public art by the local sculptor, Pierre de Grauw, entitled "La rencontre" ("the meeting"), which depicted two individuals in discussion, was installed in front of the building in 2017.
