= Hôtel de Ville, Cachan =

Town hall in Cachan, France

Hôtel de Ville
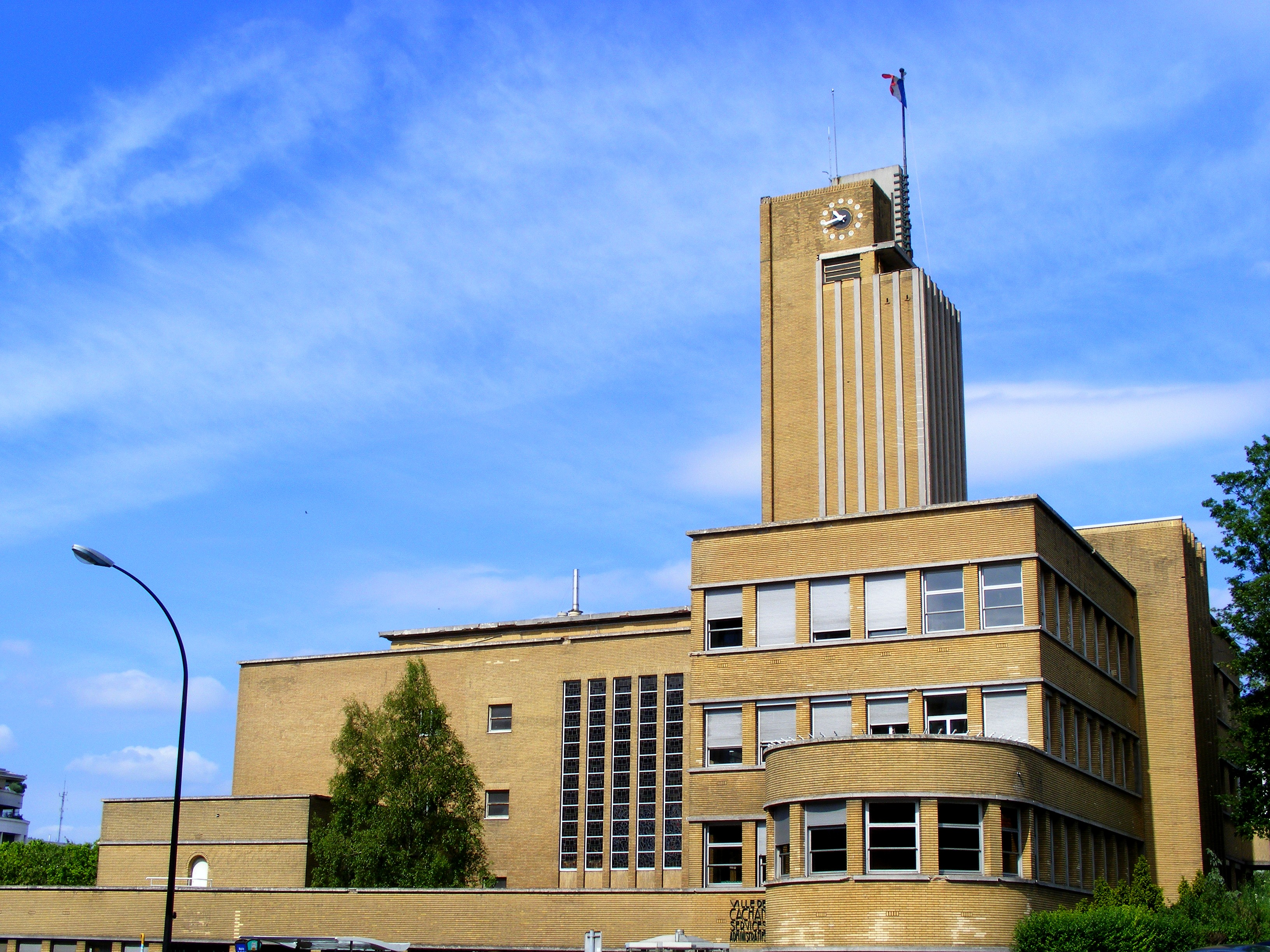
- The main frontage of the Hôtel de Ville in May 2011

General information
- Type: City hall
- Architectural style: Art Deco style
- Location: Cachan, France
- Coordinates: 48.7946°N 2.3341°E
- Completed: 1935

Design and construction
- Architects: Jean-Baptiste Mathon, Joannès Chollet and René Chaussat

Monument historique
- Official name: Hôtel de ville
- Type: Inscrit
- Designated: 2002
- Reference no.: PA94000015

The Hôtel de Ville (French pronunciation: [otɛl də vil], City Hall) is a municipal building in Cachan, Val-de-Marne in the southern suburbs of Paris, standing on Rue Camille-Desmoulins. It was designated a monument historique by the French government in 2002.

== History ==
Following the separation of Cachan from the commune of Arcueil in December 1922, the new council initially met in a small building which was originally intended to serve as a post office.

After finding this arrangement inadequate, the council led by the mayor, Léon Eyrolles, decided to commission a dedicated town hall. The site they selected was at the southern end of the Parc Raspail, where an avenue of lime trees was cut down to allow the development to proceed. The Château Raspail dated from the mid-18th century. It was owned by a banker, Sieur Artaud, from the early 19th century, then by the mayor, Armand Colmet, in the mid-19th century, and later by the Raspail family, from 1862, before being acquired by the Department of the Seine in 1900. The Department of the Seine used it as care home for the elderly before making the southern part of its grounds available to the new commune of Cachan in the 1920s.

Construction of the new building started in 1933. It was designed in the Art Deco style by Jean-Baptiste Mathon, Joannès Chollet and René Chaussat. It was built with a reinforced concrete frame and faced in brown brick from Champigny-sur-Marne by the Société d'Entreprises Centrales Françaises ('ECF'), and was officially opened by the future Prime Minister of France, Pierre Laval, on 31 March 1935.

The design involved a main block containing the public rooms facing onto Rue Camille-Desmoulins, a three-storey block containing the municipal offices, which was projected forward on the right-hand side and featured a single-storey semi-circular section at the front, together with a tall tower with a clock and a flagpole at the northwest corner. The design was influenced by that of Hilversum Town Hall in the Netherlands. Internally, the principal rooms were the Salle du Conseil (council chamber) and the Salle des Mariages (wedding room), both of which occupied the full height of the main block.

A dispute arose over the bricks used for the building. One of the architects, Mathon, rejected a batch of bricks, claiming that they were defective, causing the contractor to go into liquidation. Work on the building was ultimately completed by the direct works department of the council. An independent report criticised the architect and suggested that the same bricks had been used on other projects administered by the same architects without difficulty.

The artist, Gustave Louis Jaulmes, painted a fine mural entitled "Printemps de Jaulmes" in time for the opening of the building, while another artist, Louis Barillet, created a series of four stained glass windows depicting the market, gardening, the festival and sports, while working with Jacques Le Chevallier and Théodore Hanssen, and one three-part window, depicting school, manual labour, and intellectual work, on his own.

Following the Paris insurrection on 19 August 1944, during the Second World War, the town hall was seized by the French Resistance and the tricolour was flown from the flagpole. This was a week before the official liberation of the town by the French 2nd Armoured Division, commanded by General Philippe Leclerc, on 25 August 1944.

A major programme of refurbishment works was completed to a design by the firm of Alluin & Mauduit in 2020.
