= Bagneux, Hauts-de-Seine =

Administrative division of Paris, France

Bagneux
- Commune
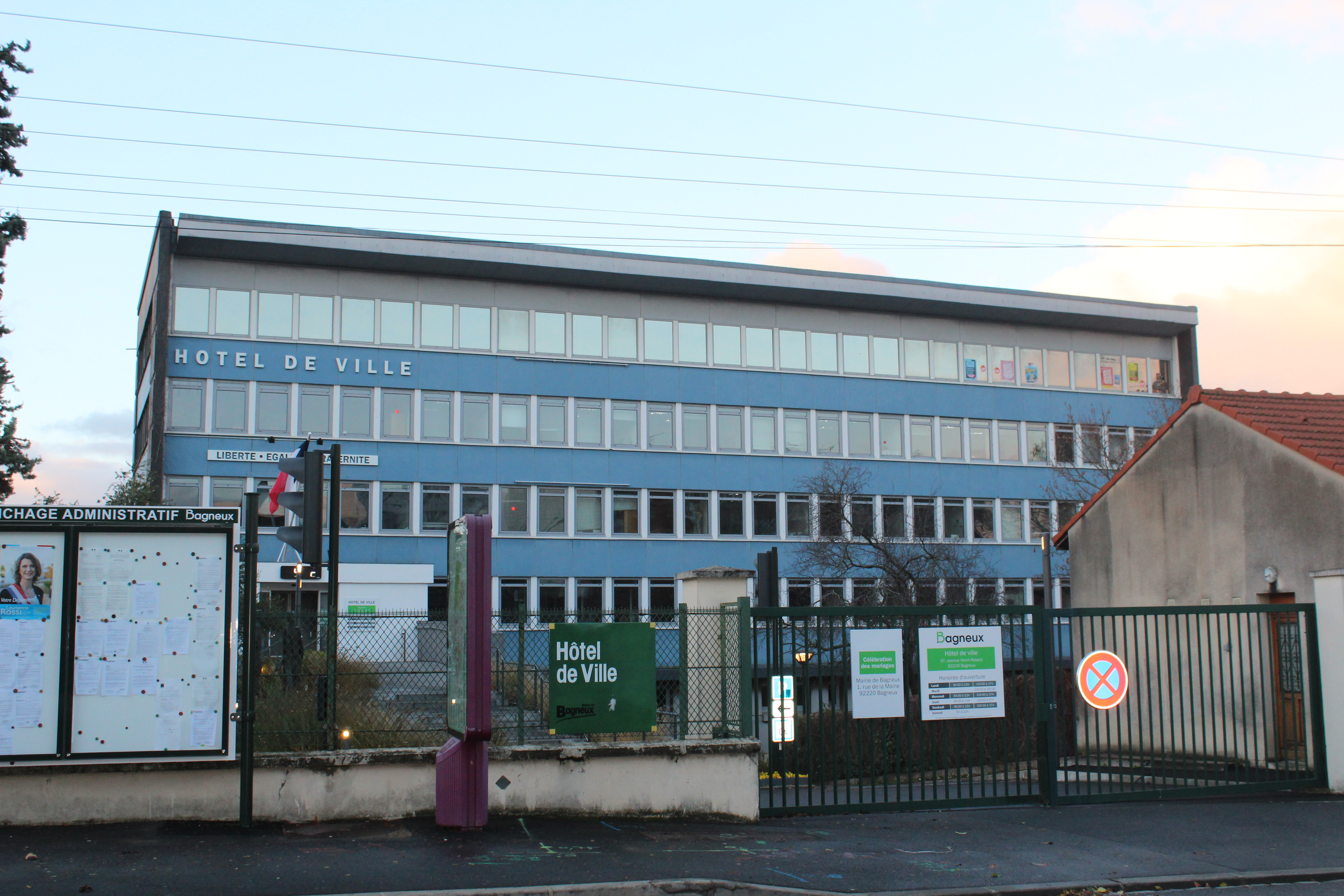
- The Hôtel de Ville

- Coat of arms

- Location (in red) within Paris inner suburbs
- Location of Bagneux
- Location within France Location within Île-de-France (region)
- Coordinates: 48°47′54″N 2°18′49″E
- Country: France
- Region: Île-de-France
- Department: Hauts-de-Seine
- Arrondissement: Antony
- Canton: Bagneux
- Intercommunality: Grand Paris

Government
  - Mayor (2026–32): Hélène Cillieres
- Area^{1}: 4.19 km^{2} (1.62 sq mi)
- Elevation: 90 m (300 ft)
- Highest elevation: 111 m (364 ft)
- Lowest elevation: 55 m (180 ft)
- Population (2023): 44,572
  - Density: 10,600/km^{2} (27,600/sq mi)
- Time zone: UTC+01:00 (CET)
  - Summer (DST): UTC+02:00 (CEST)
- INSEE/Postal code: 92007 /92220
- ^{1} French Land Register data, which excludes lakes, ponds, glaciers > 1 km^{2} (0.386 sq mi or 247 acres) and river estuaries.

Bagneux (French pronunciation: [baɲø]) is a commune in the Hauts-de-Seine department, in the southern suburbs of Paris, France. It is located 7.7 km (4.8 mi) from the center of Paris.

== History ==
The name Bagneux is believed to derive from the Latin balneolum, meaning “little bath”, perhaps referring to springs that once existed in the area.

The Hôtel de Ville was built for industrial purposes and completed in 1959.

== Geography ==
The commune of Bagneux is surrounded by the following communes, from the north and clockwise: Montrouge, Arcueil, Cachan, Bourg-la-Reine, Sceaux, Fontenay-aux-Roses and Châtillon.

== Transport ==
Bagneux is served by Bagneux–Lucie Aubrac station on Paris Métro Line 4. Bagneux is also served by two stations on the edge of its boundary - Bagneux station on RER line B (on the territory of the neighbouring commune Cachan), and Barbara on Paris Métro Line 4 (on the territory of the neighbouring commune Montrouge).

== Population ==
Historical population

Year	Pop.	±% p.a.
1793	493	—
1800	592	+2.65%
1806	638	+1.26%
1821	660	+0.23%
1831	879	+2.91%
1836	930	+1.13%
1841	1,075	+2.94%
1846	1,201	+2.24%
1851	1,156	−0.76%
1856	1,289	+2.20%
1861	1,358	+1.05%
1866	1,712	+4.74%
1872	1,459	−2.63%
1876	1,509	+0.85%
1881	1,509	+0.00%
1886	1,500	−0.12%
1891	1,580	+1.04%
1896	1,742	+1.97%
1901	2,199	+4.77%

Year	Pop.	±% p.a.
1906	2,273	+0.66%
1911	2,752	+3.90%
1921	3,491	+2.41%
1926	5,414	+9.17%
1931	8,398	+9.18%
1936	12,492	+8.27%
1946	12,425	−0.05%
1954	13,774	+1.30%
1962	38,044	+13.54%
1968	42,006	+1.66%
1975	40,674	−0.46%
1982	40,385	−0.10%
1990	36,364	−1.30%
1999	37,252	+0.27%
2007	38,592	+0.44%
2012	38,398	−0.10%
2017	40,918	+1.28%
2023	44,572	+1.44%

Source: EHESS and INSEE (1968-2023)

== Economy ==
The commune has the head office of La Compagnie (DreamJet).

== Education ==
Primary schools include:

- 10 preschools
- 7 elementary schools

The commune has four junior high schools (collèges): Henri-Barbusse, Joliot-Curie, Romain-Rolland, and École les Jacquets.

The commune has one public senior high school, Lycée professionnel Léonard-de-Vinci. Other public high schools in the area:

- Lycée technique Jean-Jaurès in Châtenay-Malabry
- Lycée Maurice-Genevoix in Montrouge
- Lycée Lakanal in Sceaux
- Lycée Marie-Curie in Sceaux

There is also a private junior and senior high school, Groupe scolaire Saint-Gabriel.

== Gnomon ==
à 07h00, Par Le 2 novembre 2013 (2013-11-02). "Le mystère du gnomon". leparisien.fr (in French).

== International relations ==
Bagneux is twinned with:

- Grand-Bourg, Guadeloupe, France, since 1998
- Turin, Italy, since 1978
- Vanadzor, Armenia, since 2006

== See also ==
- Communes of the Hauts-de-Seine department
