= Setback (land use) =

Required distance in front of a building

In land use, a setback is the minimum distance which a building or other structure must be set back from a street or road, a river or other stream, a shore or flood plain, or any other place which is deemed to need protection. Depending on the jurisdiction, other things like fences, landscaping, septic tanks, and various potential hazards or nuisances might be regulated and prohibited by setback lines. Setbacks along state, provincial, or federal highways may also be set in the laws of the state or province, or the federal government.

Local governments create setbacks through ordinances, zoning restrictions, and Building Codes, usually for reasons of public policy such as safety, privacy, and environmental protection.

Neighborhood developers may create setback lines (usually defined in Covenants & Restrictions, and set forth in official neighborhood maps) to ensure uniform appearance in the neighborhood and prevent houses from crowding adjacent structures or streets. In some cases, building ahead of a setback line may be permitted through special approval.

== Overview ==
Homes usually have a setback from the property boundary, so that they cannot be placed close together. Setbacks may also allow for public utilities to access the buildings, and for access to utility meters. In some municipalities, setbacks are based on street right-of-ways, and not the front property line. Nonetheless, many of the world's cities, such as those built in the US before 1916 and the beginnings of zoning in the United States, do not employ setbacks. Zoning –and laws pertaining to site development, such as setbacks for front lawns– has been criticized recently by urban planners (most notably Jane Jacobs) for the role that these laws have played in producing urban sprawl and automobile-dependent, low-density cities.

Older houses have smaller setbacks between properties, as walking was a primary mode of transportation and the distance people walked to actual destinations and, eventually, streetcar stops had to be kept short out of necessity. Distances of one to five feet at most are common in neighborhoods built in the United States before 1890, when the electric streetcar first became popular. Most suburbs laid out before 1920 have narrow lots and setbacks of five to fifteen feet between houses. As automobile ownership became common, setbacks increased further because zoning laws required developers to leave large spaces between the house and street.

Recently, in some areas of the United States, setback requirements have been lowered so as to permit new homes and other structures to be closer to the street, one facet of the low impact development urban design movement. This permits a more usable rear yard and limits new impervious surface areas for the purposes of stormwater infiltration.

Mailboxes, on the other hand, often have a maximum setback instead of a minimum one. A postal administration or postmaster may mandate that if a mailbox on a street is too far from the curb for the letter carrier to insert mail, without having to get out of the vehicle, the mail may not be delivered to that address at all until the situation is corrected.

== Setbacks in Canada ==
British Columbia uses a minimum setback of 4.5 metres (15 feet) of any building, mobile home, retaining wall, or other structure from all highway rights-of-way under the jurisdiction of the Ministry of Transportation and Infrastructure unless the building has access from another street, in which case the allowed setback is 3 metres (10 feet).

== See also ==
- Easement
