= Laplace station =

Railway station in Arcueil, France

Laplace
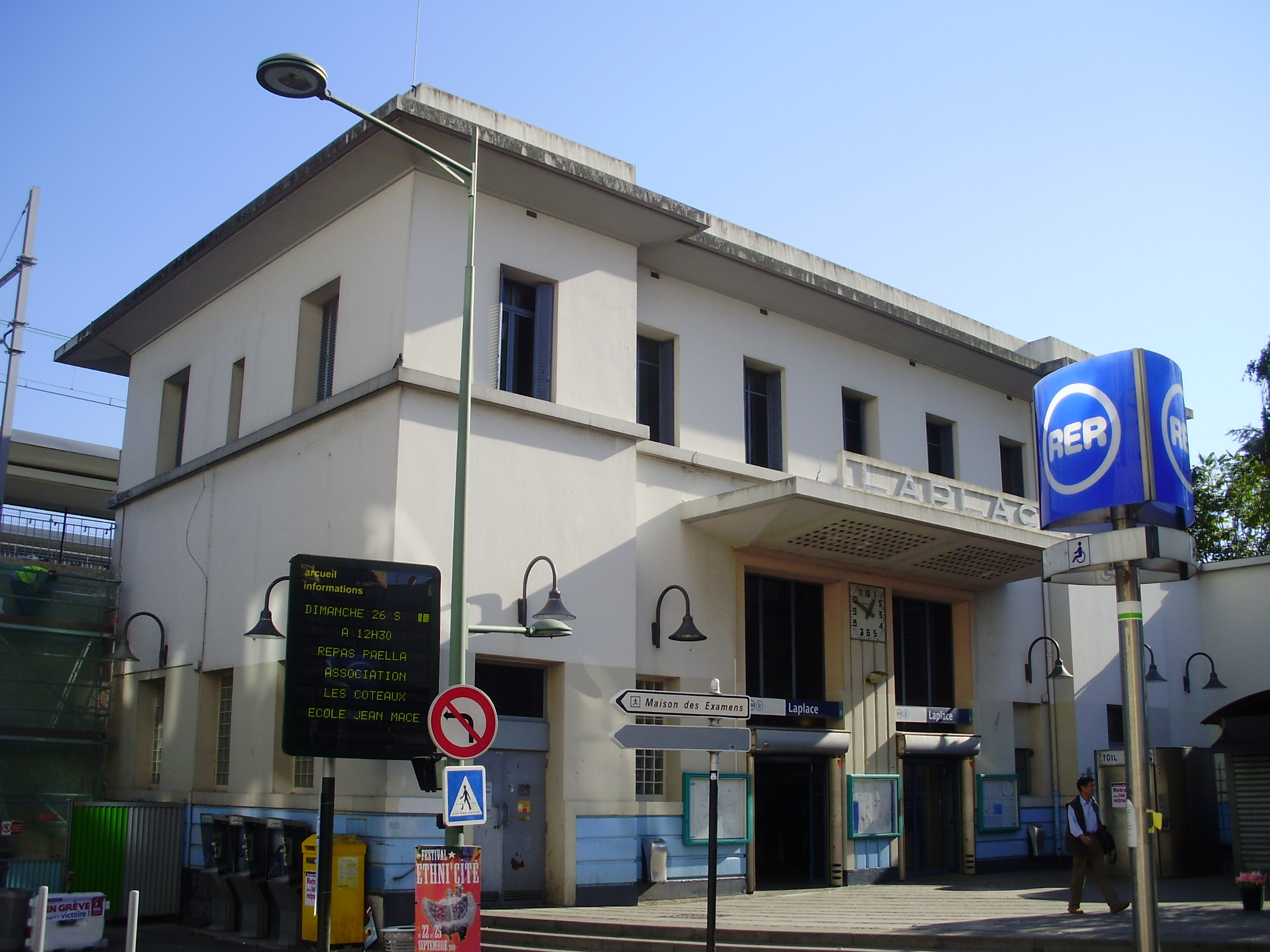
- Entrance to the station

General information
- Location: Arcueil; France
- Coordinates: 48°48′27″N 2°19′59″E
- Operator: RATP Group
- Line: Ligne de Sceaux
- Platforms: 1 side platform 1 island platform
- Tracks: 3
- Connections: RATP Bus: 57 323 380; Noctilien: N21

Construction
- Structure type: Below-grade
- Accessible: Yes, by request to staff

Other information
- Station code: 87758664
- Fare zone: 2

History
- Opened: 7 June 1846

Passengers
- 2019: 3,707,718

Services
Preceding station	RER	Following station
Gentilly towards Aéroport Charles de Gaulle 2 TGV or Mitry–Claye	RER B	Arcueil–Cachan towards Robinson or Saint-Rémy-lès-Chevreuse
Location

Laplace station is a station on the line B of the Réseau Express Régional, a hybrid suburban commuter and rapid transit line. It is located in the city of Arcueil.

== History ==
Originally a Sceaux line station, it was rebuilt in the "Art Deco" style by the Compagnie du chemin de fer métropolitain de Paris (CMP) as part of the line's modernization work in the 1930s. The name comes from the eponymous avenue passing below the station.

== Railway situation ==
The station, built in embankment, has 3 tracks (Track 1, 2 and Z) with a lateral platform, on the east side, for trains going south, and a central island platform for the other two tracks. There is a platform, still visible, but unused, at the southern end of the current station, alongside the passenger building which allowed trains from the south to be overtaken. The switch has been removed and the track serves as a garage track.

This configuration allows the Local train to be overtaken by the semi direct train in a disturbed situation, in normal situation the timing is calculated to avoid this.The station is also used as a terminus during morning rush hour, or during a disturbed situation, in both directions. The station is advertised in the trains with the precision "Maisons des Examens" (although this mention does not appear on any map), because it is located near the "Maisons des Examens" managed by the Interacademic Service for Examinations and Competitions.

The station has two accesses:

- Avenue Laplace: access with two elevators.
- 2 Rue Ernest-Renan ("Maisons des Examens")

The station is located at "Point Kilometrique" (PK) 9.081 (southern ending of platforms)

== Connection ==
The station is served by:

- RATP Bus: 57 323 380
- Noctilien: N21

== Gallery ==
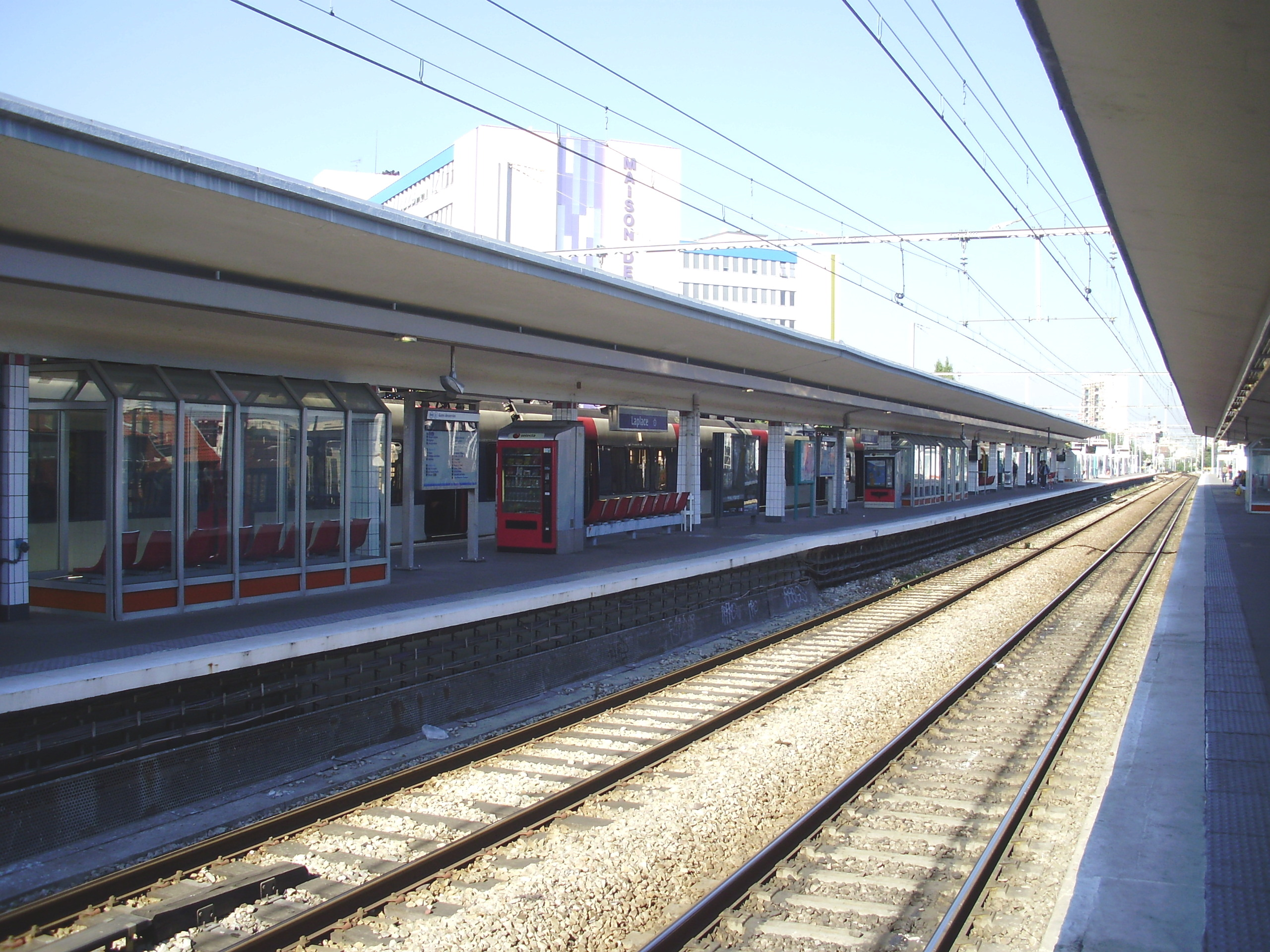
Platform towards Paris

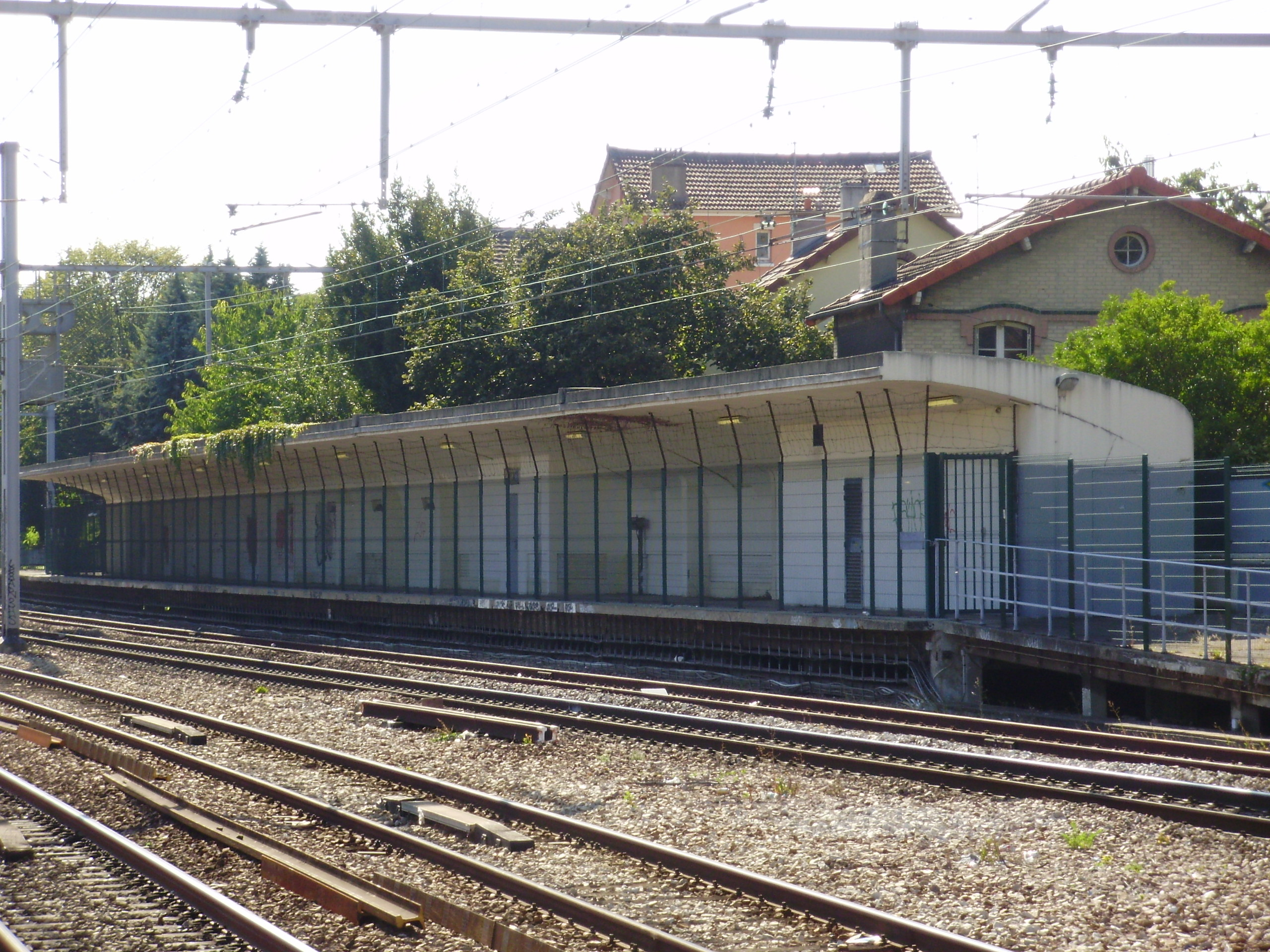
the old unused platform

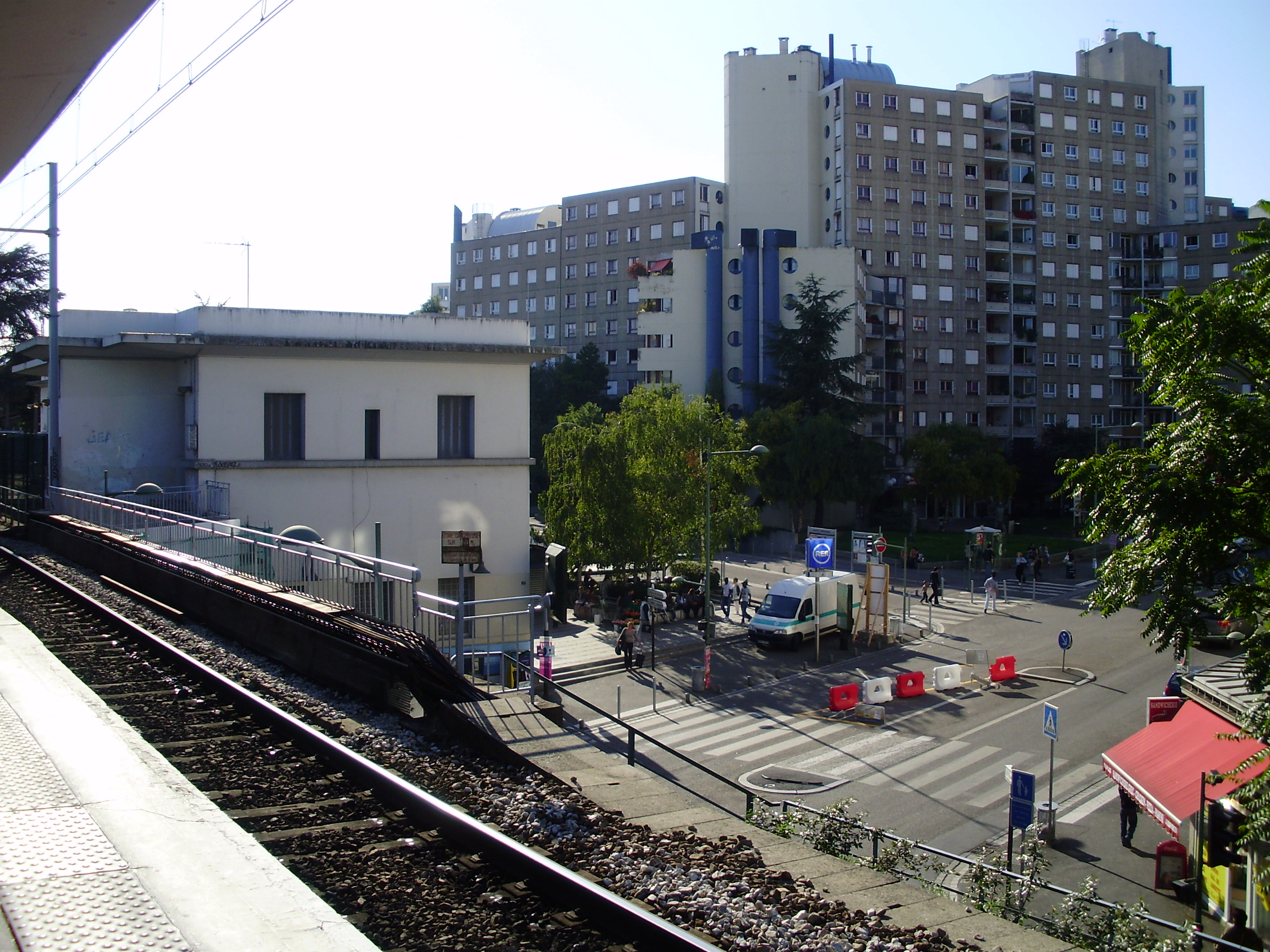
West side of the station

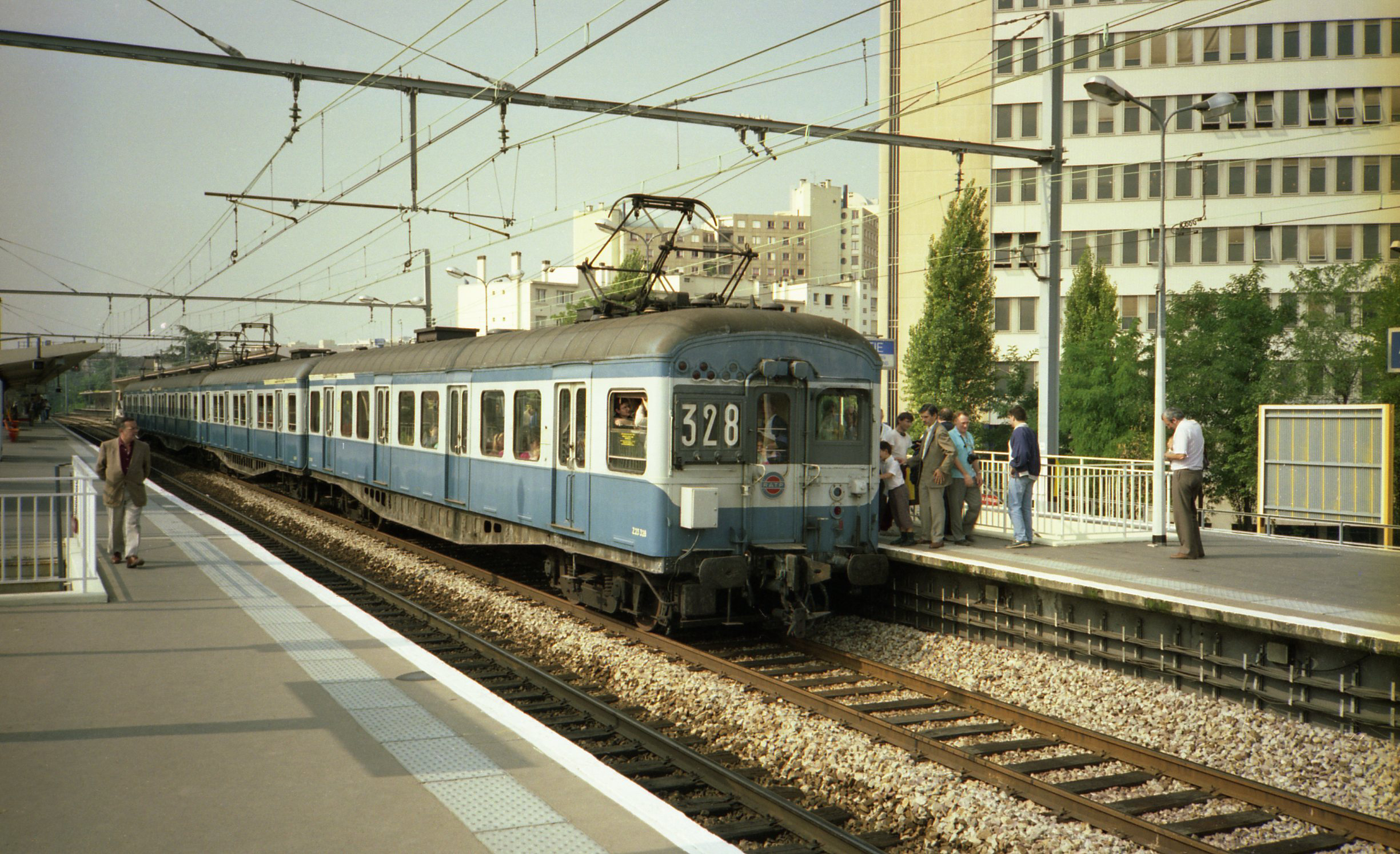
The old trainset at Laplace named "Z" during 80's (Z23000)

== See also ==
- List of Réseau Express Régional stations
