= Cachan =

- Commune
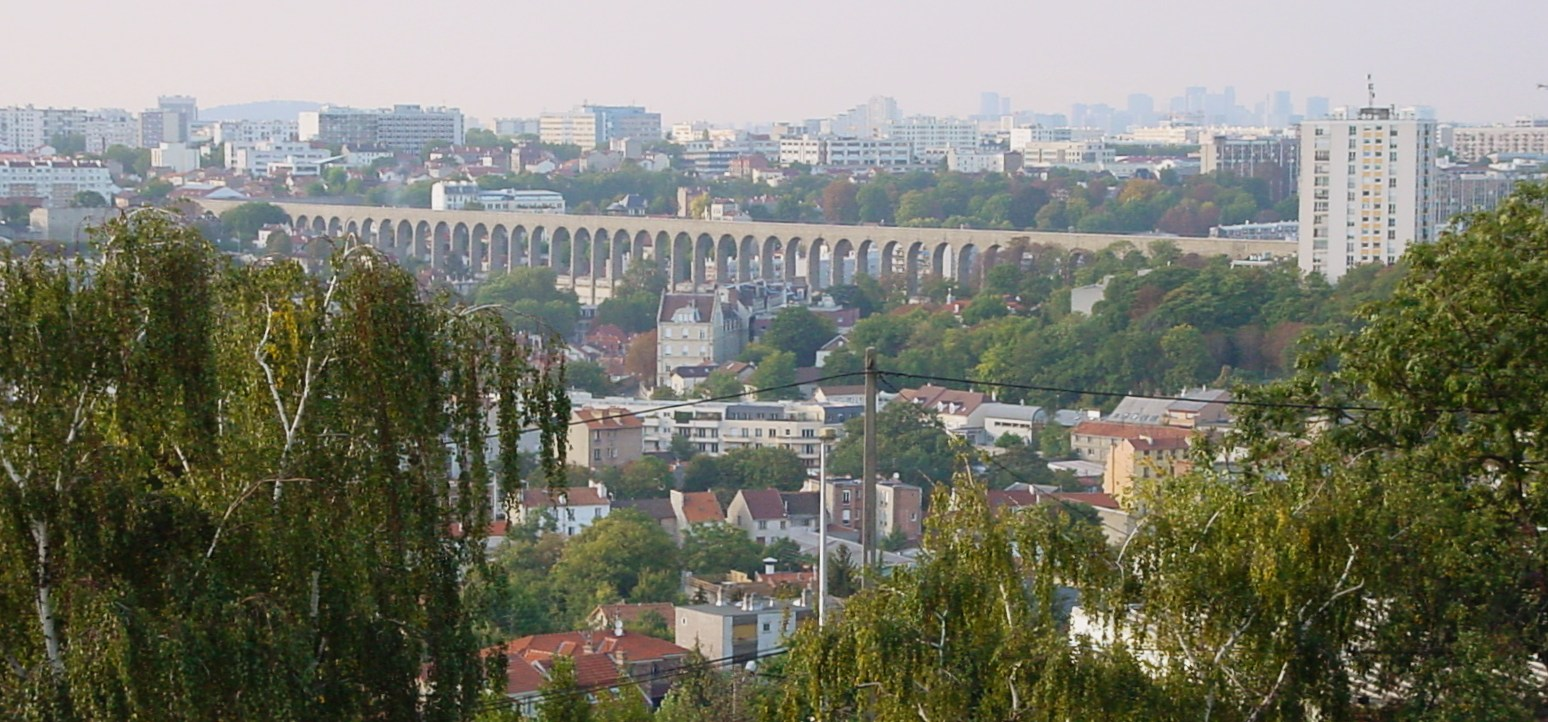
- Cachan in the foreground, with the Medici Aqueduct in the background, and Paris beyond

- Coat of arms

- Location (in red) within Paris inner suburbs
- Location of Cachan
- Location within France Location within Île-de-France (region)
- Coordinates: 48°47′31″N 2°19′55″E
- Country: France
- Region: Île-de-France
- Department: Val-de-Marne
- Arrondissement: L'Haÿ-les-Roses
- Canton: Cachan
- Intercommunality: Grand Paris

Government
  - Mayor (2026–32): Hélène de Comarmond (PS)
- Area^{1}: 2.78 km^{2} (1.07 sq mi)
- Highest elevation: 108 m (354 ft)
- Lowest elevation: 43 m (141 ft)
- Population (2023): 31,103
  - Density: 11,200/km^{2} (29,000/sq mi)
- Time zone: UTC+01:00 (CET)
  - Summer (DST): UTC+02:00 (CEST)
- INSEE/Postal code: 94016 /94230
- ^{1} French Land Register data, which excludes lakes, ponds, glaciers > 1 km^{2} (0.386 sq mi or 247 acres) and river estuaries.

Cachan (French pronunciation: [kaʃɑ̃]) is a commune in the southern suburbs of Paris, France. It is located in the Val-de-Marne department, 6.7 km (4.2 mi) from the center of Paris.

The prestigious École Spéciale des Travaux Publics is located there.

== Name ==
During the Middle Ages, Cachan was referred to in Medieval Latin texts as Caticantum, later corrupted into Cachentum, Cachant, and then Cachan. Some understand Caticantum as meaning "singing of the cat", "mewing of the cat", but this is not certain. Some others see a connection with the verb "to hunt" (captiare in Vulgar Latin, chacier in Old French).

== History ==
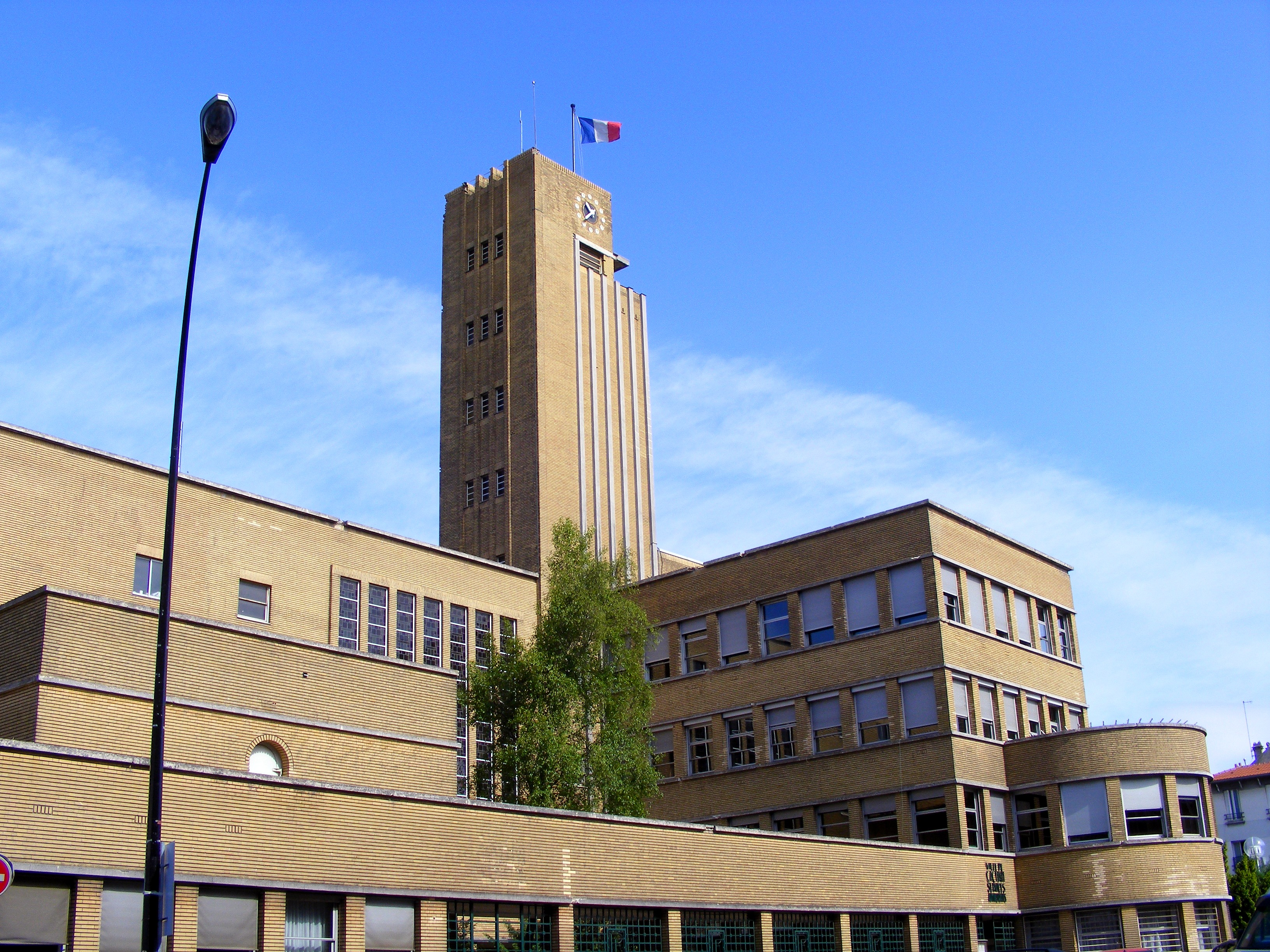
The Hôtel de Ville

Cachan was originally a hamlet within the commune of Arcueil, later renamed Arcueil-Cachan. The commune of Cachan was created on 26 December 1922 when it seceded from the commune of Arcueil-Cachan, which was renamed back to Arcueil. The Hôtel de Ville was completed in 1935.

== Population ==
Historical population

Year	Pop.	±% p.a.
1926	9,829	—
1931	12,790	+5.41%
1936	14,567	+2.64%
1946	15,156	+0.40%
1954	16,965	+1.42%
1962	23,282	+4.04%
1968	26,187	+1.98%
1975	26,442	+0.14%

Year	Pop.	±% p.a.
1982	23,930	−1.42%
1990	24,266	+0.17%
1999	24,838	+0.26%
2007	27,383	+1.23%
2012	28,365	+0.71%
2017	31,069	+1.84%
2023	31,103	+0.02%

Source: EHESS and INSEE (1968-2023)

== Neighboring communes ==
- Arcueil - north
- Villejuif - east
- L'Haÿ-les-Roses - southeast
- Bourg-la-Reine - southwest
- Bagneux - west

== Transport ==
Cachan is served by two stations on Paris RER line B: Arcueil–Cachan and Bagneux.

== Education ==
Primary schools:

- Six public preschools (écoles maternelles): Belle Image, Carnot, Coteau, Paul-Doumer, La Plaine, and Pont-Royal
- Five public elementaries: Belle Image, Carnot, Coteau, Paul-Doumer, La Plaine
- One private preschool and elementary: École Saint-Joseph

Secondary schools:

- Public junior high schools: Collège Victor-Hugo and Collège Paul-Bert
- Private junior high: Collège Saint-Joseph
- Public high schools/sixth-form colleges: Lycée Gustave Eiffel, Lycée Maximilien Sorre, Le Foyer de Cachan

== See also ==
- Communes of the Val-de-Marne department
- École normale supérieure Paris-Saclay
- François Bazin (sculptor)
