= Bagneux station =

Railway station in Cachan, France

Bagneux
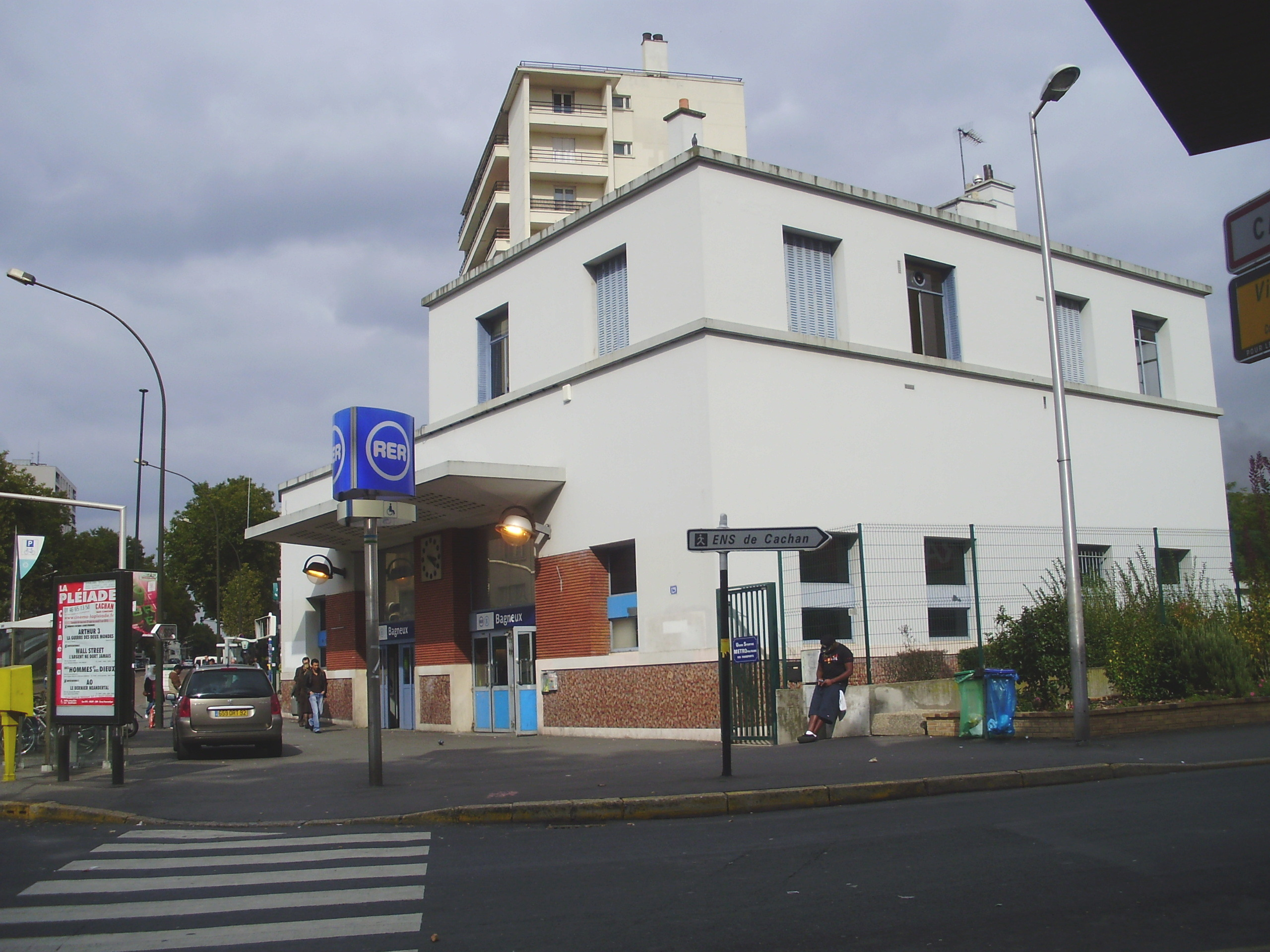
- Entrance to the station

General information
- Location: 129 Avenue Aristide Briand; Cachan; France
- Coordinates: 48°47′36″N 2°19′17″E
- Operator: RATP Group
- Line: Ligne de Sceaux
- Platforms: 2 side platforms
- Tracks: 2
- Connections: RATP Bus: 197 391; Valouette: V3; Noctilien: N14

Construction
- Structure type: Below-grade
- Accessible: Yes, by request to staff

Other information
- Station code: 87758680
- Fare zone: 3

Passengers
- 2019: 2,241,461

Services
Preceding station	RER	Following station
Arcueil–Cachan towards Aéroport Charles de Gaulle 2 TGV or Mitry–Claye	RER B	Bourg-la-Reine towards Robinson or Saint-Rémy-lès-Chevreuse
Location

Bagneux station (French: Gare de Bagneux) is a station on the line B of the Réseau Express Régional, a hybrid suburban commuter and rapid transit line. The station takes its name from its location near the city of Bagneux, Hauts-de-Seine, but the station itself is inside the town of Cachan.

== Railway situation ==
The station is located in Cachan, at the edge of the D920 (ex-RN20), named avenue Aristide-Briand at this point, the main north / south axis which marks the municipal and departmental limit with Bagneux.

It also bears the name of “Pont Royal”, a public road south of the station being called “avenue du Pont-Royal”. It is therefore one of the two RER stations in Cachan, the other being the Arcueil - Cachan station, at the edge of Arcueil, approximately 800 meters to the north, on the same line.

The station is in the classic configuration of two platforms surrounding 2 tracks. The only special case, being that the station is in a particularly tight curve, followed by a counter curve in a southerly direction, limiting the speed to 70 kph for semi-direct trains. The station is built with an open trench below the road. Access to the platforms is only via their southern end, where the passenger building is located, built above the two tracks.

The station is located at Kilometric Point (KP) 11 (point at the southern end of the station).

== Connection ==
The station is served by:

- RATP Bus: 197 391
- Valouette: V3
- Noctilien: N14

== Gallery ==
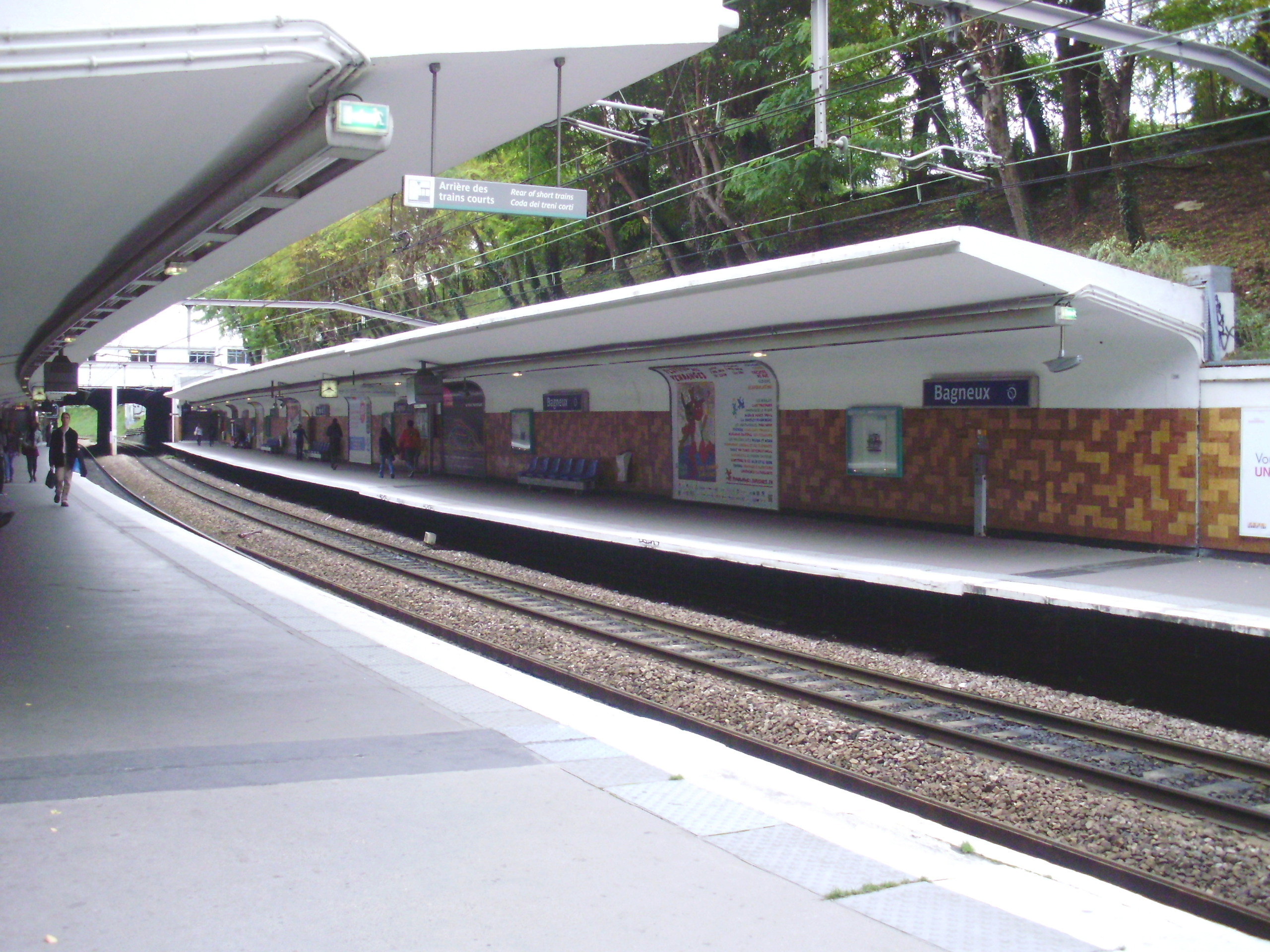
Platform to the south, note the tunnel under the RD 920

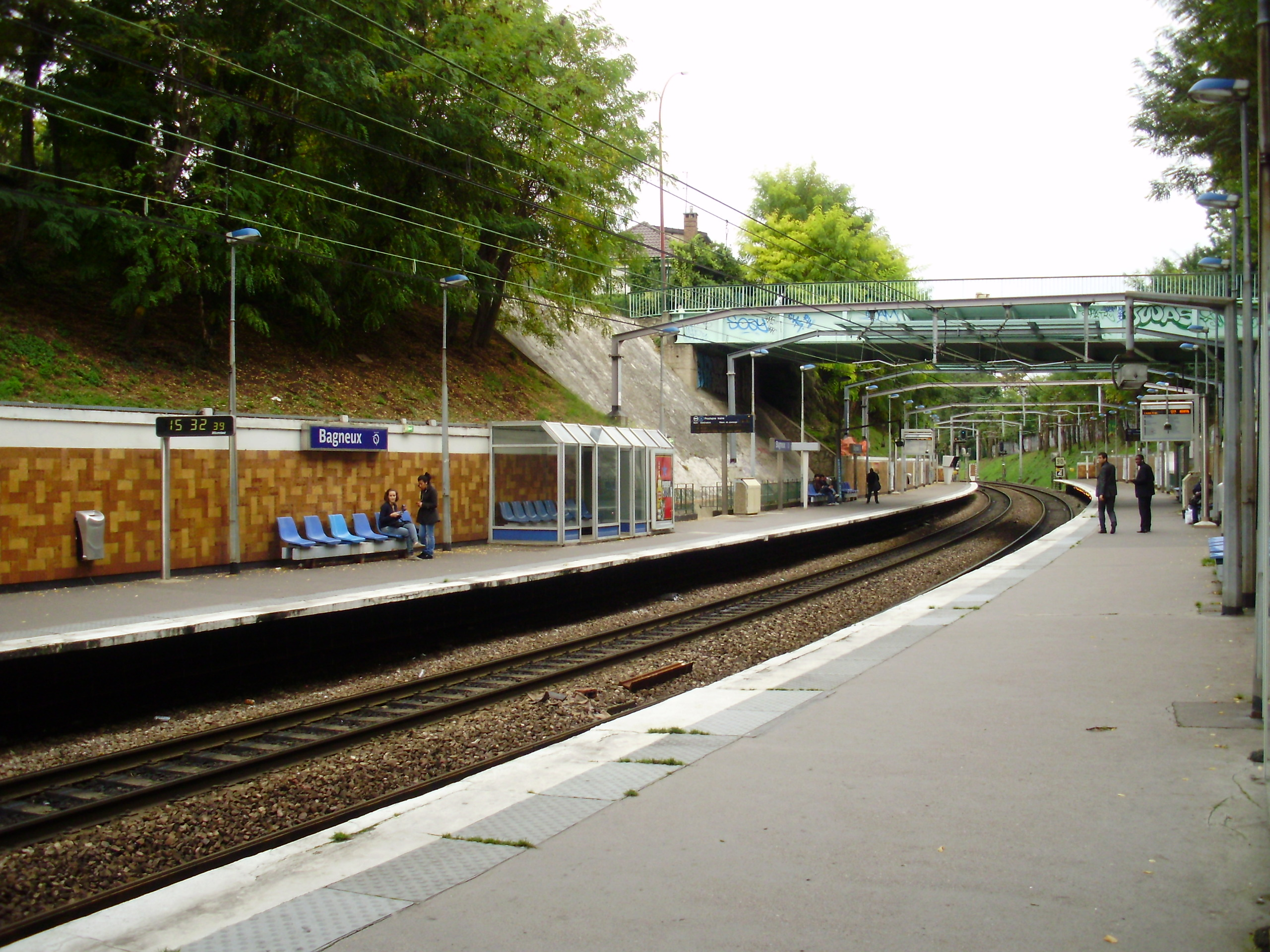
Platform to the North

== See also ==
- List of stations of the Paris RER
