= Arcueil–Cachan station =

Railway station in Cachan, France

Arcueil–Cachan
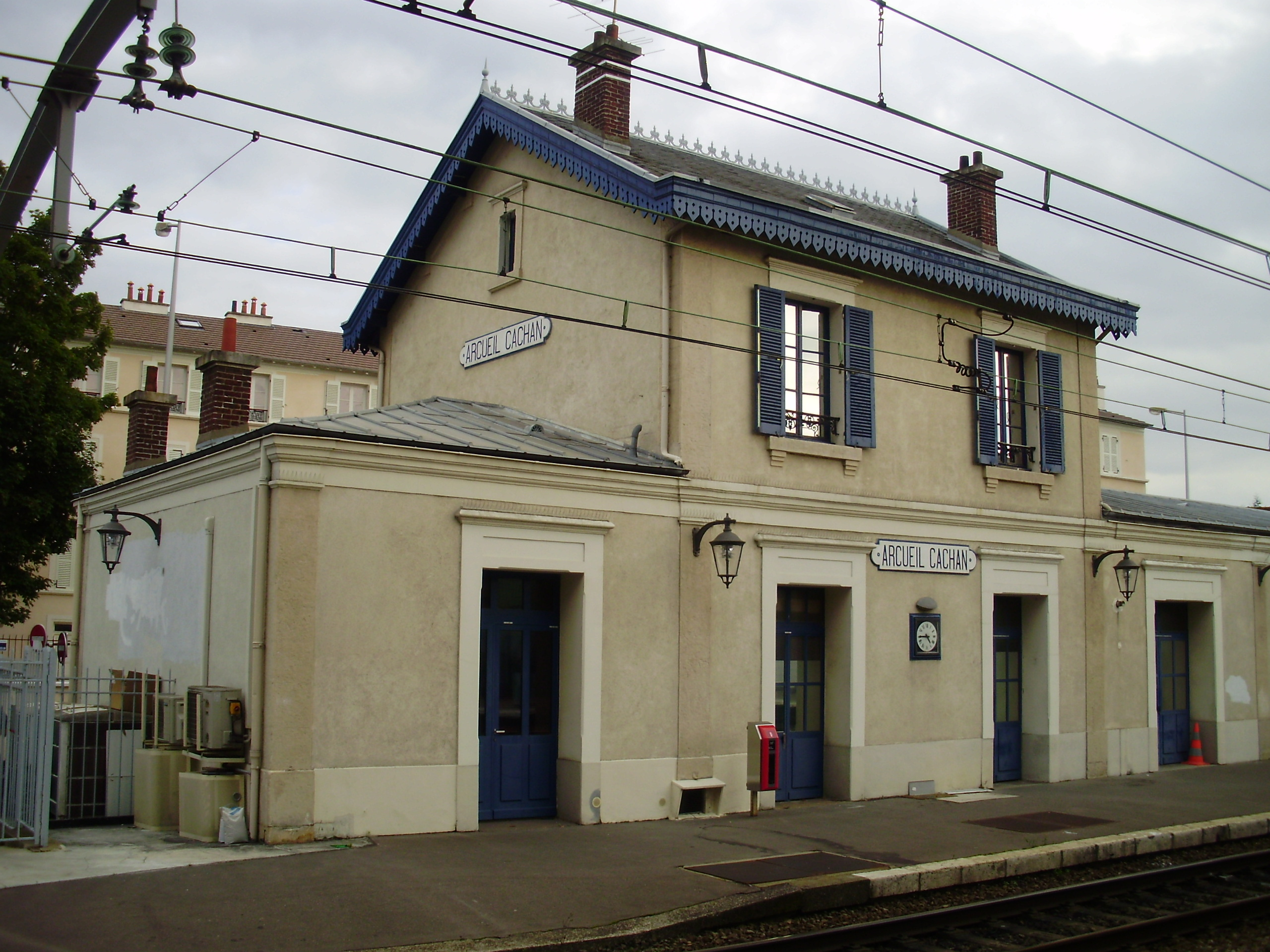
- The historic passenger building seen from Rue de la Gare to the east of the tracks

General information
- Location: Rue du Docteur-Gosselin; Cachan; France
- Coordinates: 48°47′58″N 2°19′42″E
- Operator: RATP Group
- Line: Ligne de Sceaux
- Platforms: 2 side platforms
- Tracks: 2
- Connections: RATP Bus: 162 187 193; Valouette: V3, V4

Construction
- Structure type: At-grade/embankment
- Accessible: Yes, by request to staff

Other information
- Station code: 87758672
- Fare zone: 3

History
- Opened: 7 June 1846

Passengers
- 2019: 3,634,116

Services
| Preceding station | RER | Following station |
|---|---|---|
| Laplace towards Aéroport Charles de Gaulle 2 TGV or Mitry–Claye | RER B | Bagneux towards Robinson or Saint-Rémy-lès-Chevreuse |

Future services
| Preceding station | Paris Metro | Following station |
|---|---|---|
| Bagneux–Lucie Aubrac towards Pont de Sèvres | Line 15 (autumn 2027) | Villejuif–Gustave Roussy towards Noisy–Champs |
Location

Arcueil–Cachan (French pronunciation: [aʁkœj kaʃɑ̃]) is a station on RER B of the Réseau Express Régional network, a hybrid suburban commuter and rapid transit line. Arcueil–Cachan will also be a station on Paris Metro Line 15. The station takes its name from its location near the city of Arcueil and inside the town of Cachan.

== History ==
Inaugurated on 23 June 1846, this station is one of the oldest on the line, opened on 7 June 1846. The line manager had his premises there until the 1980s. It served as a model for many other stations on the section going to Orsay. Although bearing the name of the two municipalities of Arcueil and Cachan, the passenger station is located in the territory of Cachan. The neighboring municipality of Arcueil also has access to Laplace station, further north on line B (towards Paris), which is located on its territory.

== Railway situation ==
The station is a classic configuration of two platforms surrounding 2 tracks. The station is built on a hill with a steep slope, so that the north side of the station is at ground level, and the southern part is raised above the ground (backfill).

North of the station passes the Vanne aqueduct, in the territory of Arcueil. In addition, there is an old freight station now used as a siding for certain works equipment or RATP trainsets.

By autumn 2027, it will also accommodate an underground station for line 15 of the Grand Paris Express. The future Grand Paris Express station will be located under the RER B tracks at an angle close to 90 °. Its platforms will be at a depth of −24 m. A passenger building for correspondence will be built.

The station is located at "Point Kilometrique" (PK) 10.310 (southern ending of platforms)

== Connection ==
The station is served by:

- RATP Bus: 162 187 193
- Valouette: V3, V4

== Gallery ==
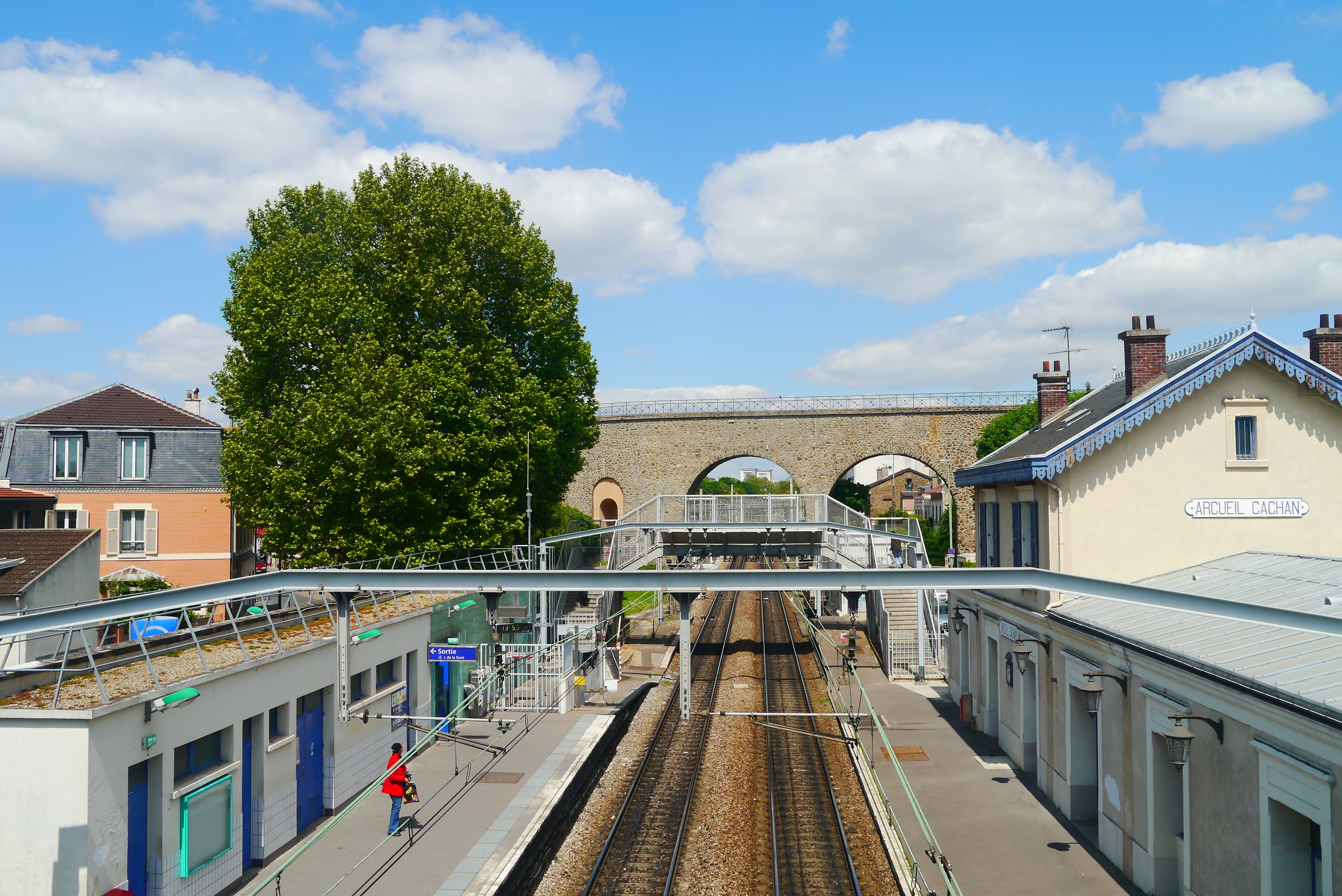
View towards Paris

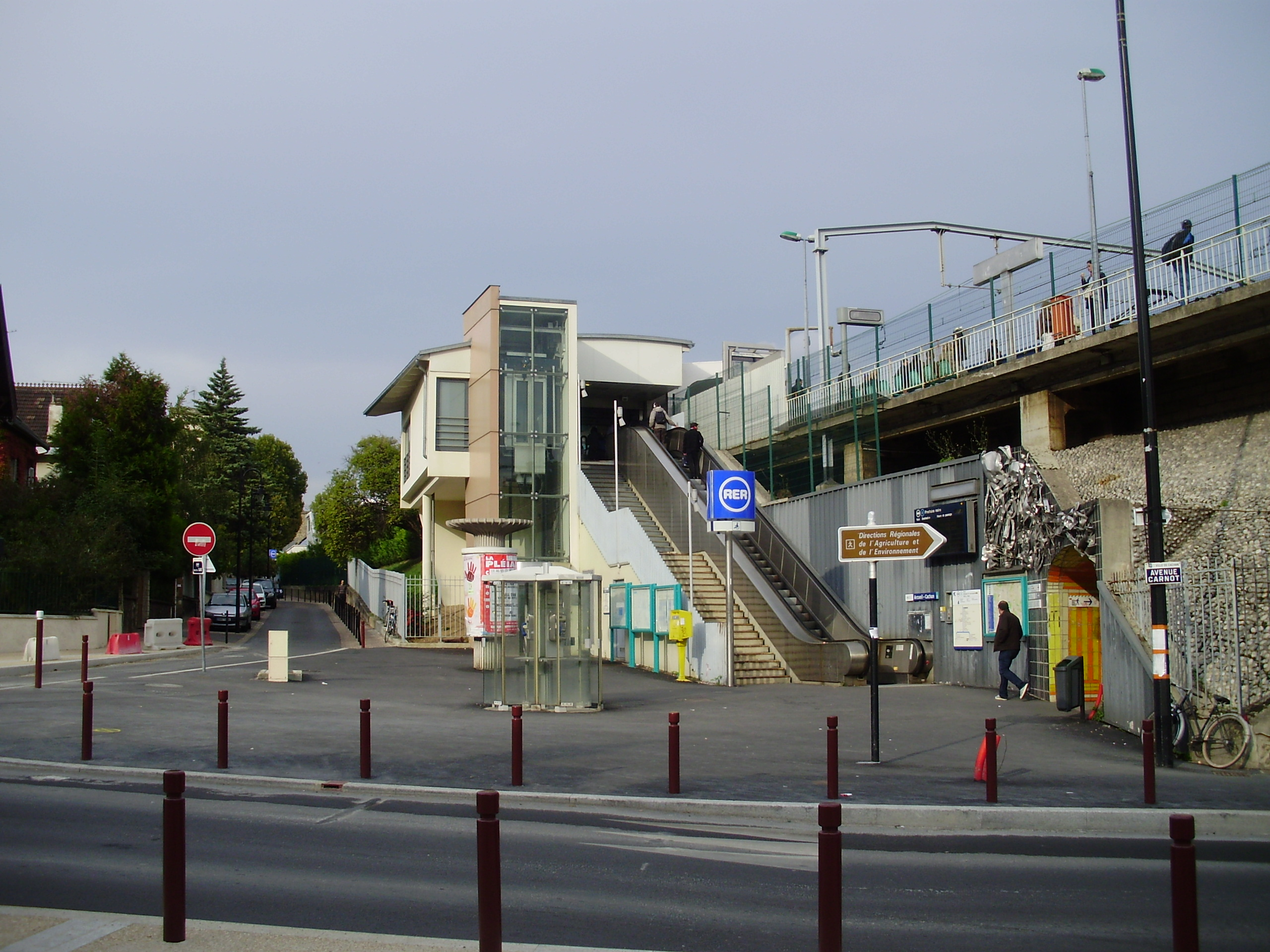
Main exit

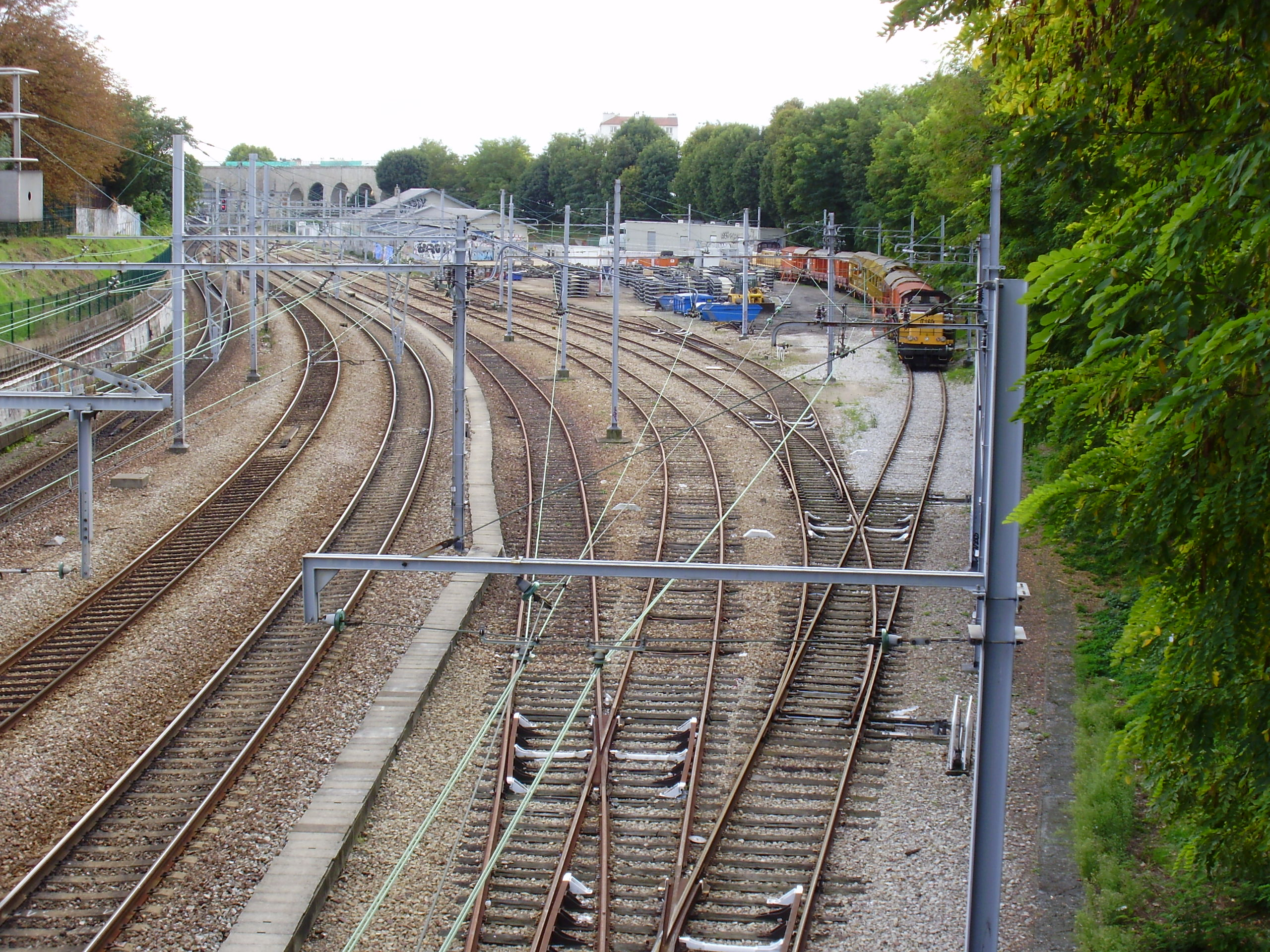
Storage tracks

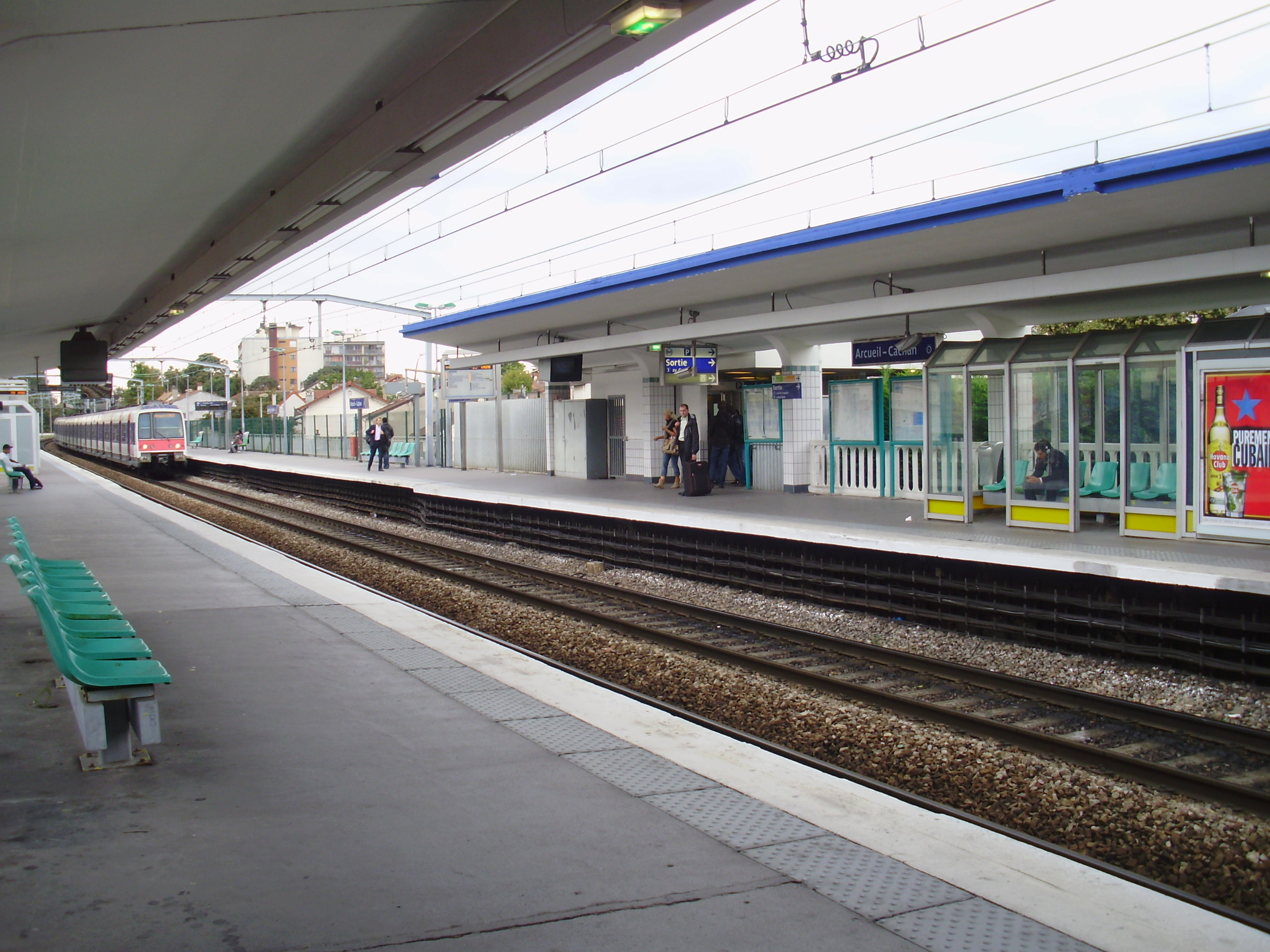
Southbound platform

== See also ==
- List of Réseau Express Régional stations
