= Bourg-la-Reine station =

Railway station in Bourg-la-Reine, France

Bourg-la-Reine
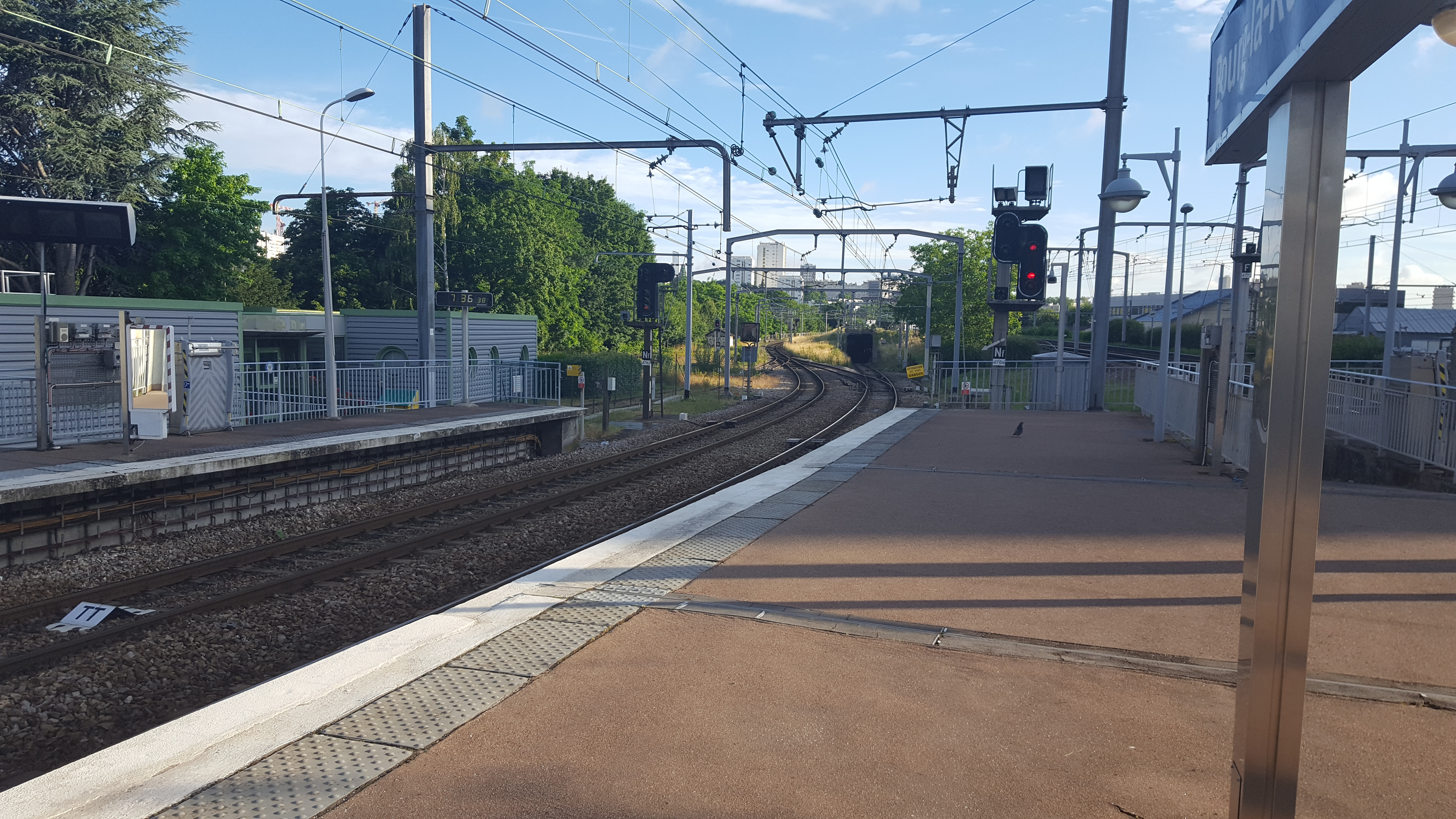
- Bourg-la-Reine station platform

General information
- Location: Boulevard Maréchal Loffre; Bourg-la-Reine; France
- Coordinates: 48°46′49″N 2°18′45″E
- Operator: RATP Group
- Line: Ligne de Sceaux
- Platforms: 2 side platforms 1 island platform
- Tracks: 5
- Connections: RATP Bus: 172 192 197 388 390 394; Le Paladin: 6, 7, 17; Noctilien: N14 N21

Construction
- Structure type: At-grade
- Accessible: Yes, by request to staff

Other information
- Station code: 87758698
- Fare zone: 3

History
- Opened: 29 July 1854

Passengers
- 2019: 4,446,499

Services
Preceding station	RER	Following station
Bagneux towards Aéroport Charles de Gaulle 2 TGV or Mitry–Claye	RER B	Sceaux towards Robinson
Bagneux towards Aéroport Charles de Gaulle 2 TGV or Mitry–Claye	RER B	Parc de Sceaux towards Saint-Rémy-lès-Chevreuse
Location

Bourg-la-Reine station (French: Gare de Bourg-la-Reine) is a railway station on the Sceaux line, located in the town of Bourg-la-Reine, Hauts-de-Seine, France.

== Railway situation ==
The station is located at "Point Kilometrique"(PK) 12.9 (PK 0.0 being in Gare du Nord, end of the RATP part), at the junction of the branches of line B of the RER towards Robinson and towards Saint-Rémy-lès -Chevreuse. The station itself is made up of five tracks, four of which are contiguous to a platform:

- track 1 for trains going south, Massy – Palaiseau or Saint-Rémy-lès-Chevreuse;
- track 2 for trains going north towards Paris and coming from Massy – Palaiseau or Saint-Rémy-lès-Chevreuse;
- track 1a for trains going southwest towards Robinson;
- track 2a for trains going north towards Paris and coming from Robinson;
- track 4, a small siding located to the west of track 2a, along the platform but not contiguous, often used to park track surveillance trains.

At the north of the station, four sidings allow the parking of trains. Two (tracks 3 and 5) are quite long for 2 EMU Mi79/84 each; two others (tracks 7 and 9), shorter and integrated into a concrete slab, pass under a porch and are used to park construction trains. The station's rights-of-way include the flying junction, built in the 1930s, as well as the A and B sidings (sometimes used as sidings or for a U-turn) and the 3T siding, all located just north of the flying junction (about 300 meters from the end of the quays to the north).

== History ==
This station has the particularity of constituting a Y, since it is common to the Robinson and Saint-Rémy-lès-Chevreuse branches, which separate shortly before, on the Paris side. During the renovation of the line by the Compagnie du chemin de fer métropolitain de Paris (CMP) in the 1930s, a flying junction was created to avoid conflicts between trains traveling in the opposite direction at the junction. .

In the early 2000s, this station was the subject of major works consisting of creating a new access leading directly to the connecting corridor, the installation of three elevators (one for each platform) and the renovation of the historic passenger building. . This station is now fully accessible to people with reduced mobility.

After the separation the central platform in two, there is an electrical substation and, remembering the Sceaux line before the RER, a metro logo carved out of hedges. In addition, another particularity of this station, the service plans were the first of the new generation to be installed on the RER A/B network.

In 2020 a new forecourt and new bus station are built

In 2016, according to RATP estimates, annual ridership was 4,462,976 travelers

== Bus connections ==
The station is served by:

- RATP Bus: 172 192 197 388 390 394
- Le Paladin: 6, 7, 17
- Noctilien: N14 N21

== Gallery ==
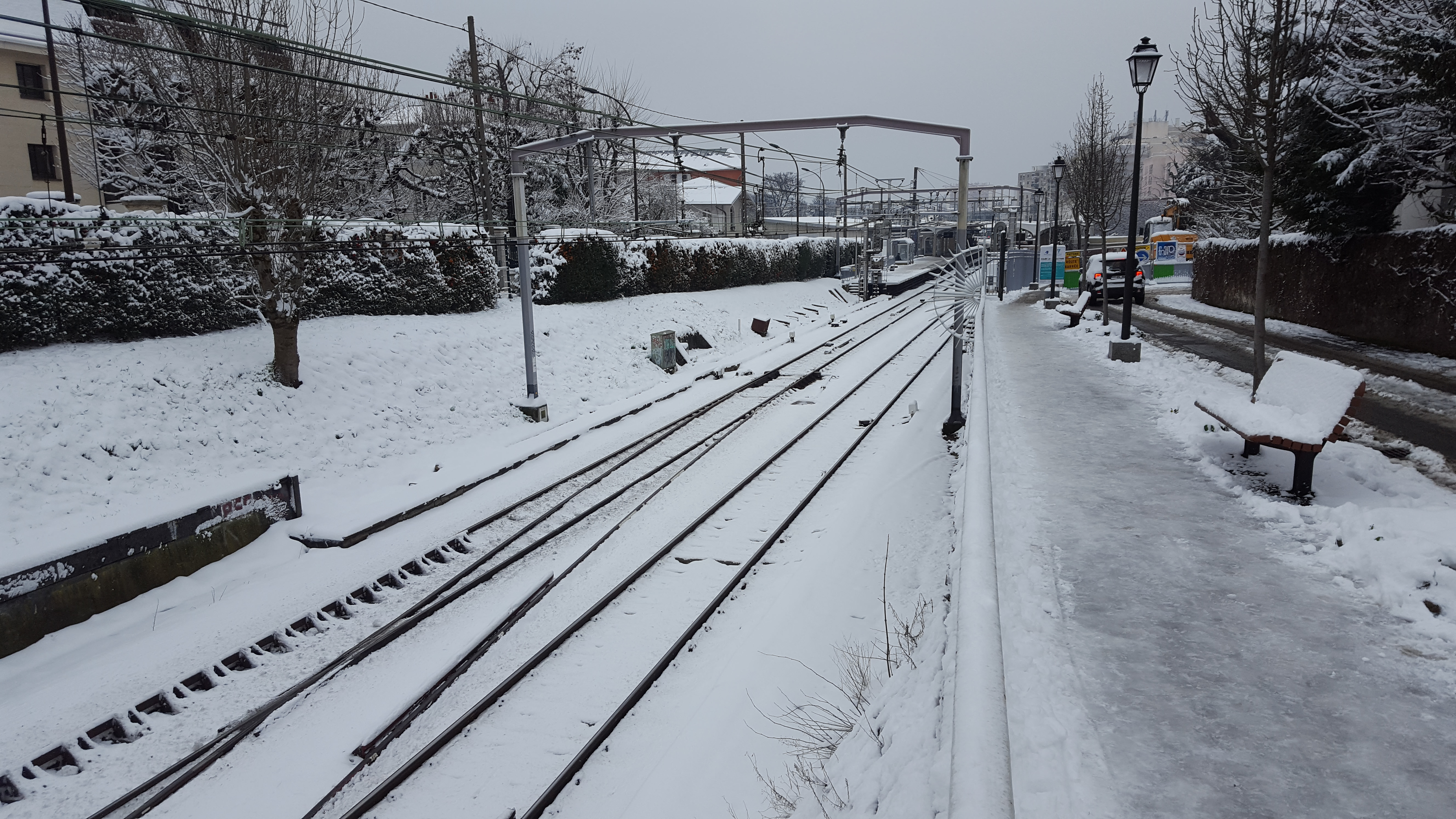
South of the station under snow

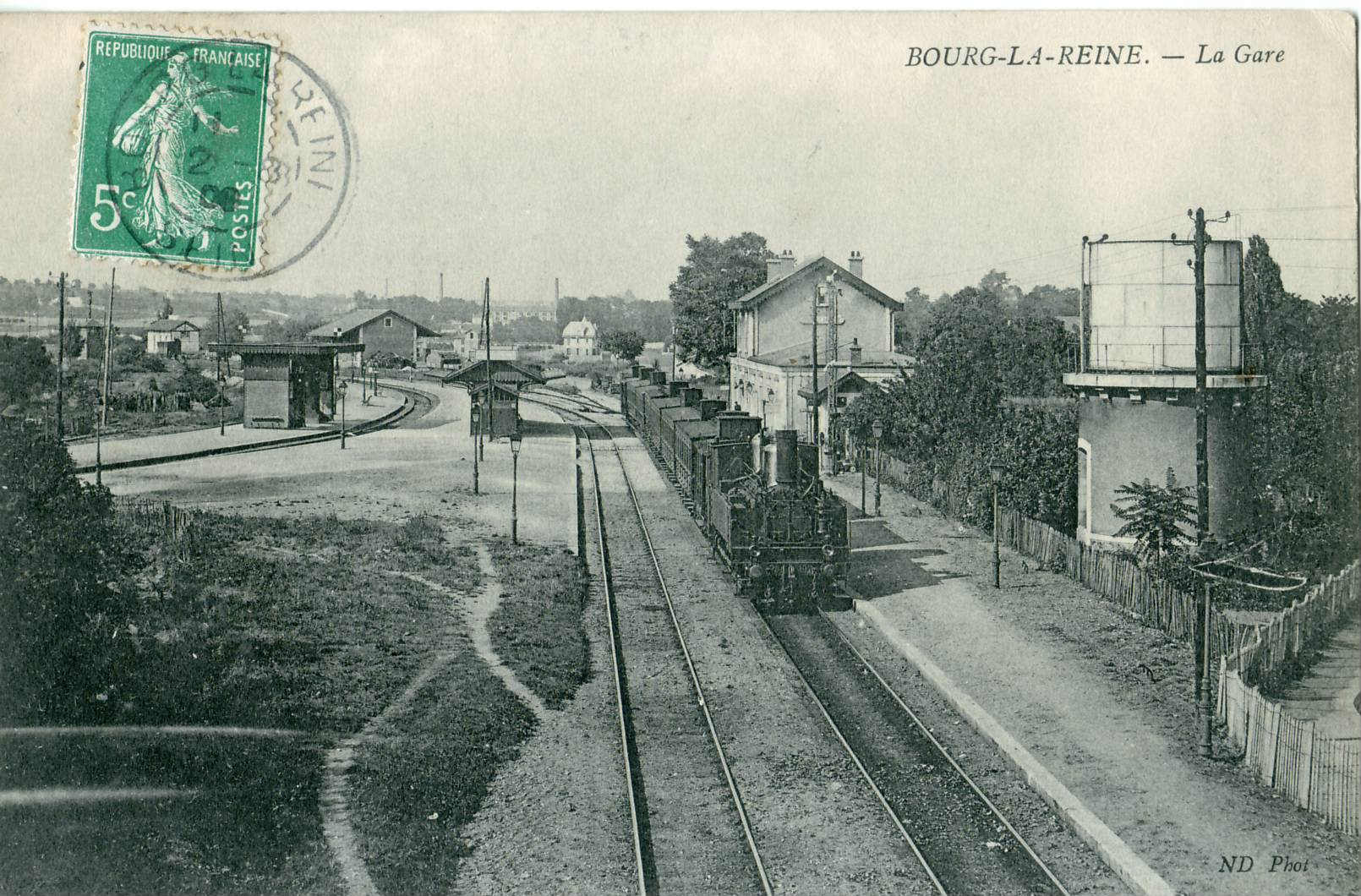
The station probably in 1907

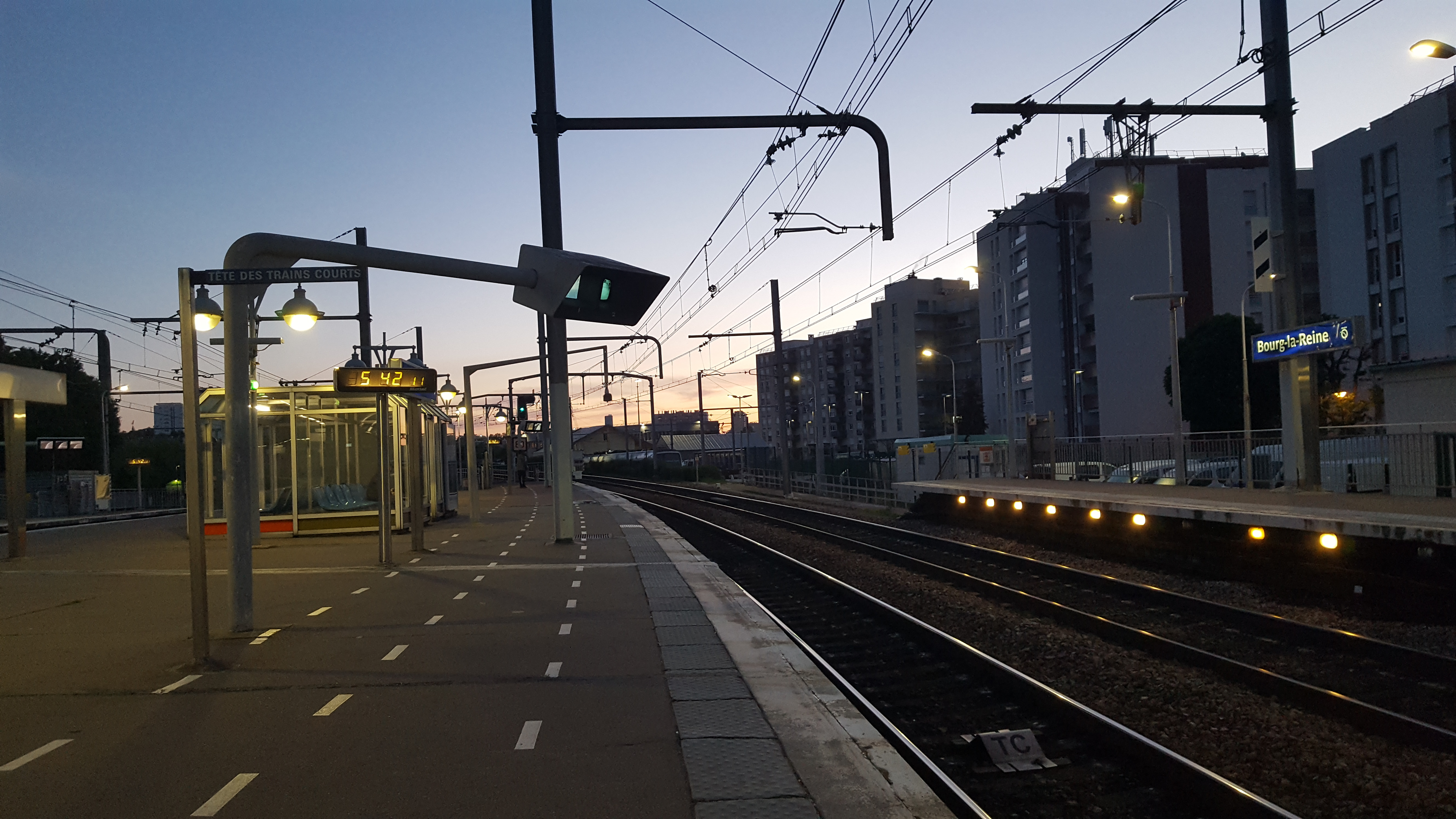
Platform 2 to the North in early morning

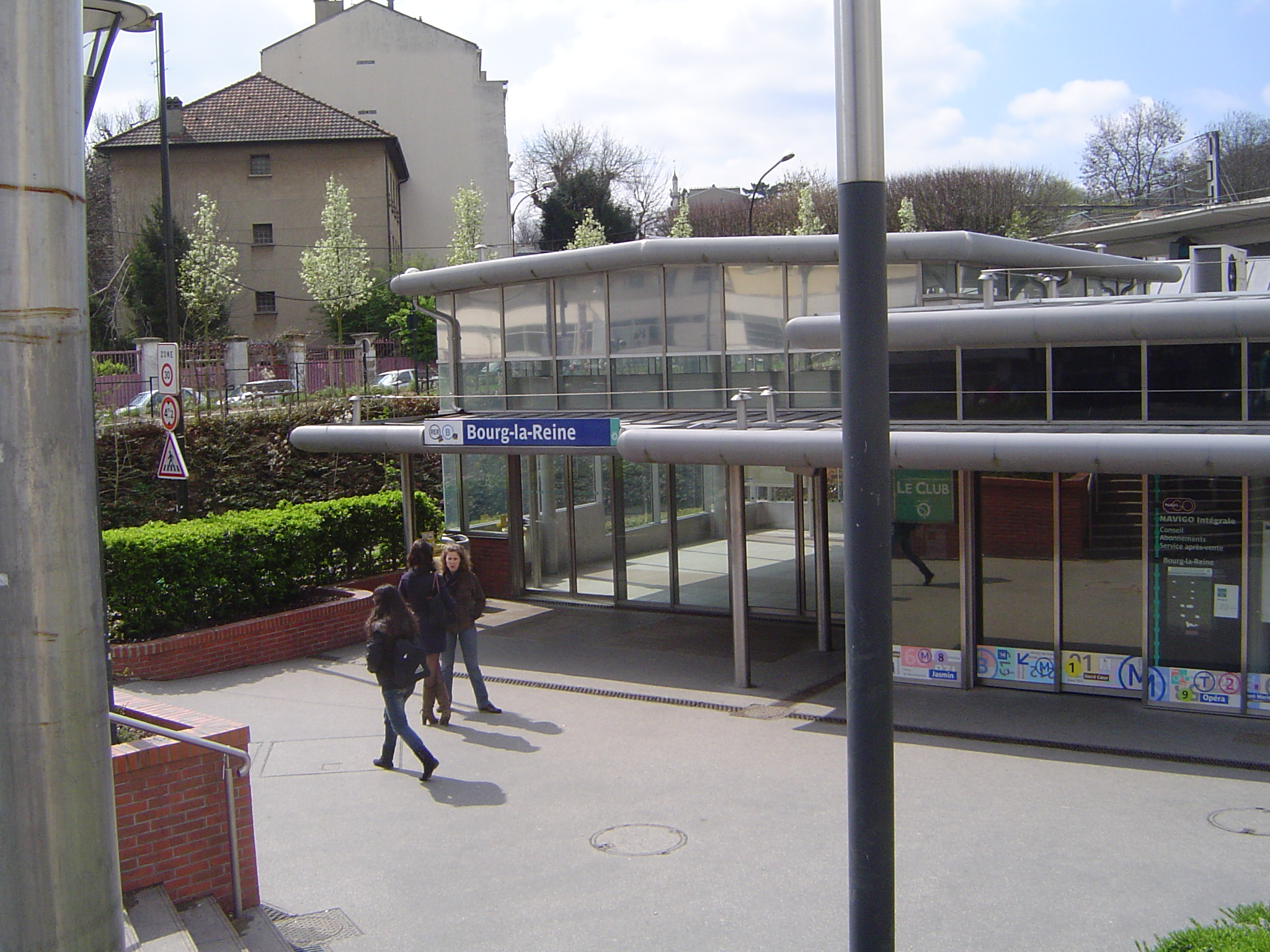
the "new entrance" built in 2000

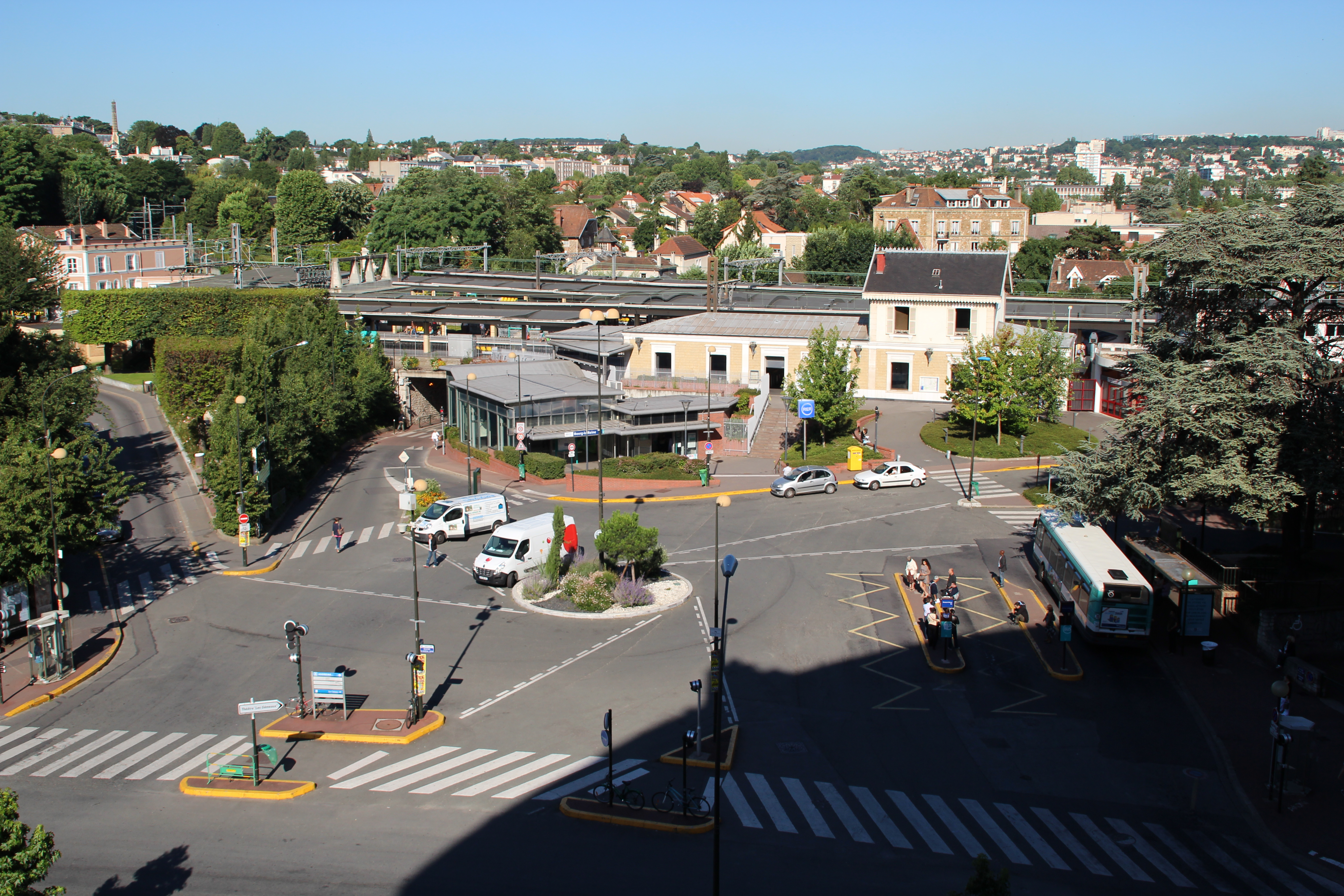
Sight of vue of the station with the old schema of the street

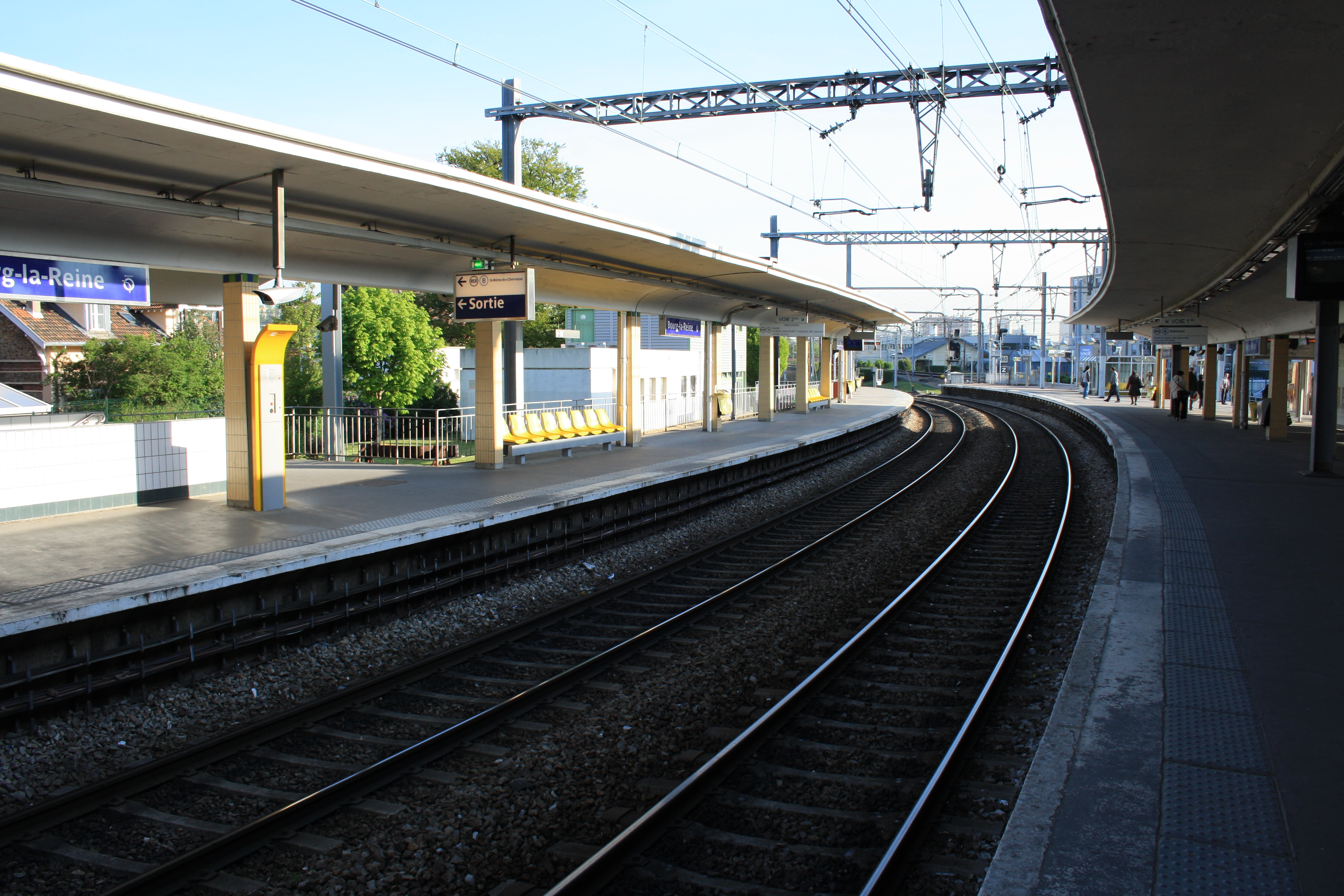
From Platform 1Bis to the North

== See also ==
- List of stations of the Paris RER
