= Prepayment =

Prepayment may refer to:

- Prepaid mobile phone, mobile phone use
- Prepayment for service, e.g. phone calls, electricity
- Prepayment of loan, repaying a loan ahead of schedule
- Deferred expense in accounting

Other disambiguation pages:

- Prepaid card
- Prepayment meter

== See also ==
- Subscription business model
