= Utility meter =

A utility meter is any of the following metering devices used on utility mains:

- Electricity meter, a device for measuring electricity usage
  - Smart meter, an electrical meter that records consumption of electric energy and communicates information to the utility for monitoring and billing
- Gas meter, a specialized flow meter used to measure the volume of fuel gases such as natural gas and propane
- Water meter, a device for measuring water usage
- Heat meter, instruments intended for measuring the heat which, in a heat-exchange circuit, is given up by a liquid called the heat-conveying liquid.

== See also ==
- Prepayment meter (disambiguation)
