= Prepayment meter =

Prepayment meter can refer to:

- Electricity meter
- Water meter
- Gas meter
- Parking meter

Other disambiguation pages:

- Pay as you go (disambiguation)
- Prepayment (disambiguation)
