= Arcueil =

- Commune
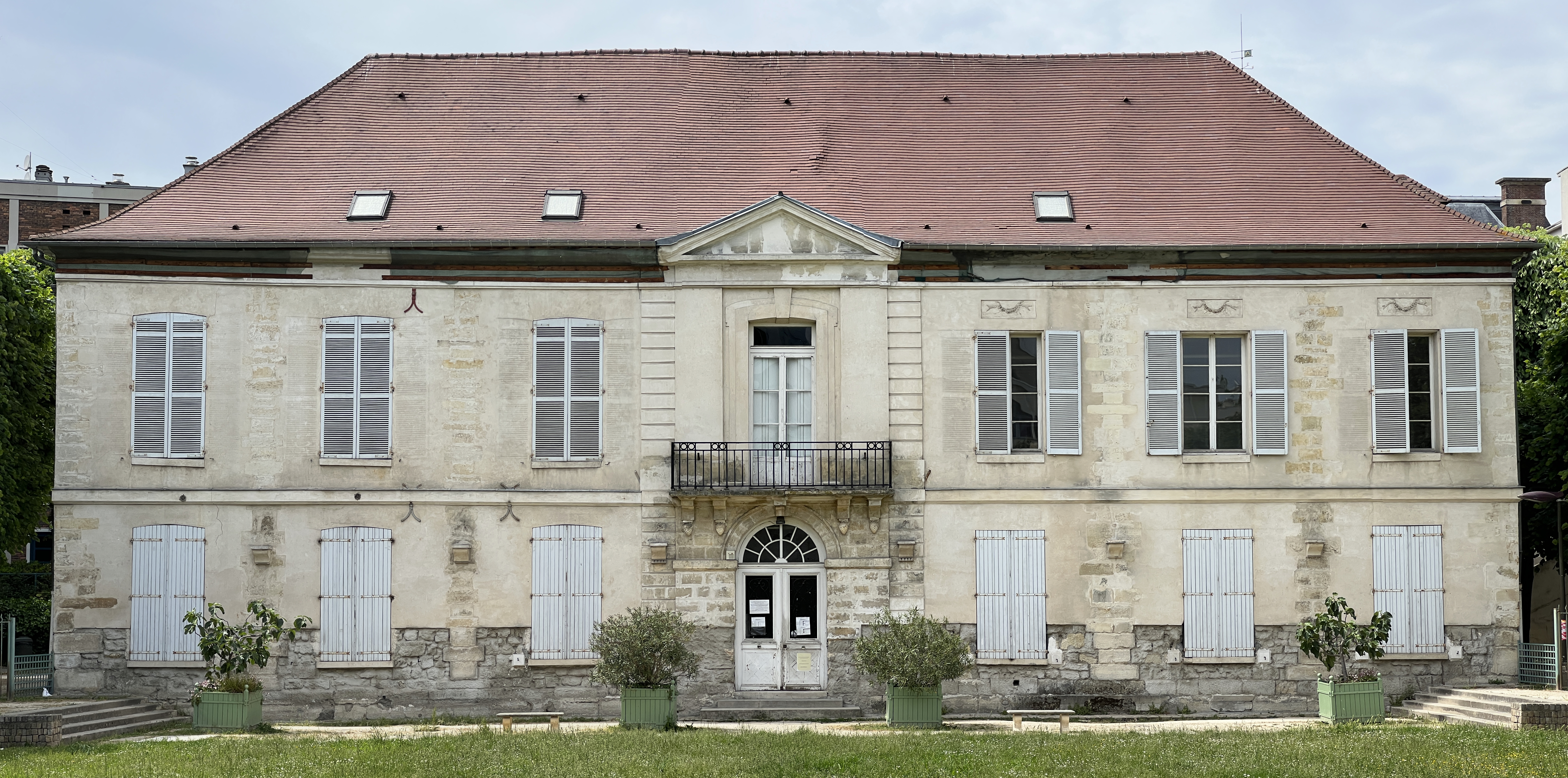
- The Maison des Gardes, part of the Guise Castle

- Coat of arms
- Location of Arcueil
- Location within France Location within Île-de-France (region)
- Coordinates: 48°48′27″N 2°20′10″E
- Country: France
- Region: Île-de-France
- Department: Val-de-Marne
- Arrondissement: L'Haÿ-les-Roses
- Canton: Cachan
- Intercommunality: Grand Paris

Government
  - Mayor (2026–32): Sophie Pascal-Lericq
- Area^{1}: 2.33 km^{2} (0.90 sq mi)
- Highest elevation: 105 m (344 ft)
- Lowest elevation: 42 m (138 ft)
- Population (2023): 22,200
  - Density: 9,530/km^{2} (24,700/sq mi)
- Demonym: Arcueillais
- Time zone: UTC+01:00 (CET)
  - Summer (DST): UTC+02:00 (CEST)
- INSEE/Postal code: 94003 /94110
- Website: www.arcueil.fr
- ^{1} French Land Register data, which excludes lakes, ponds, glaciers > 1 km^{2} (0.386 sq mi or 247 acres) and river estuaries.

Arcueil (French pronunciation: [aʁkœj]) is a commune in the Val-de-Marne department in the southern suburbs of Paris, France. It is located 5.3 km (3.3 mi) from the centre of Paris.

== Name ==
Map of Arcueil in Petite couronne

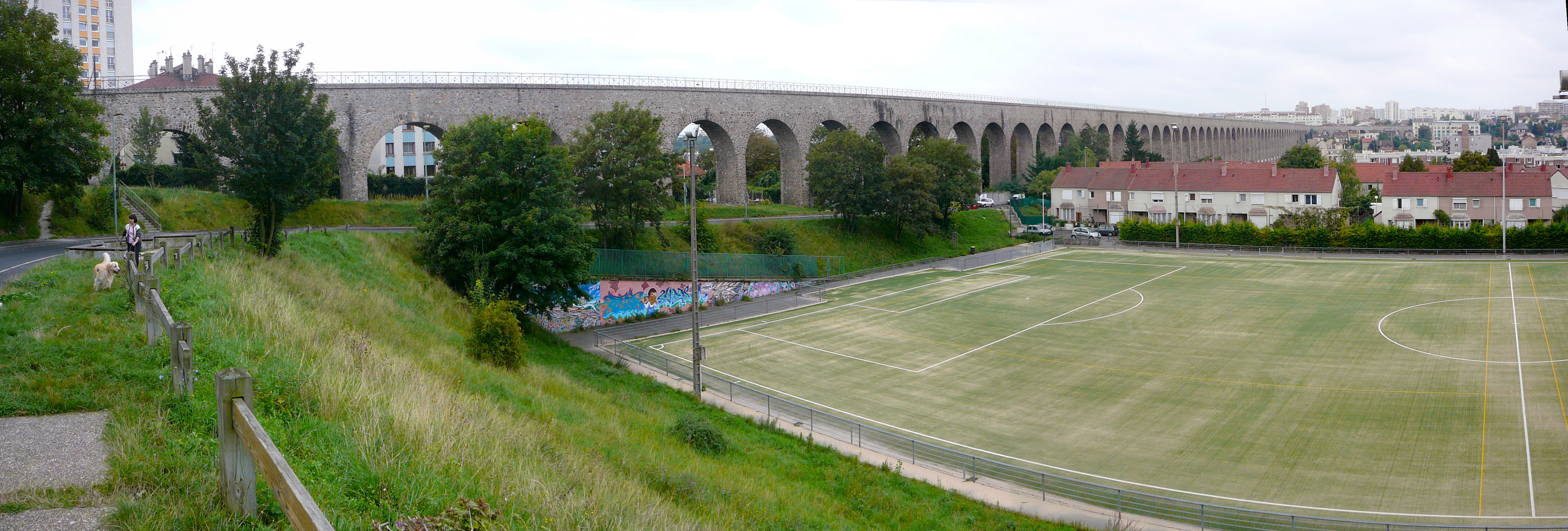
the 3rd Arcueil aqueduct, completed in 1900, and still supplying 145000 m^{3} a day to Paris.

The name Arcueil was recorded for the first time in 1119 as Arcoloï, and later in the 12th century as Arcoïalum, meaning "place of the arches" (Latin radical arcus, "arch", and Celtic suffix -ialo, "clearing, glade", "place of"), in reference to the Roman aqueduct carrying water to the Roman city of Lutetia (modern Paris).

== History ==
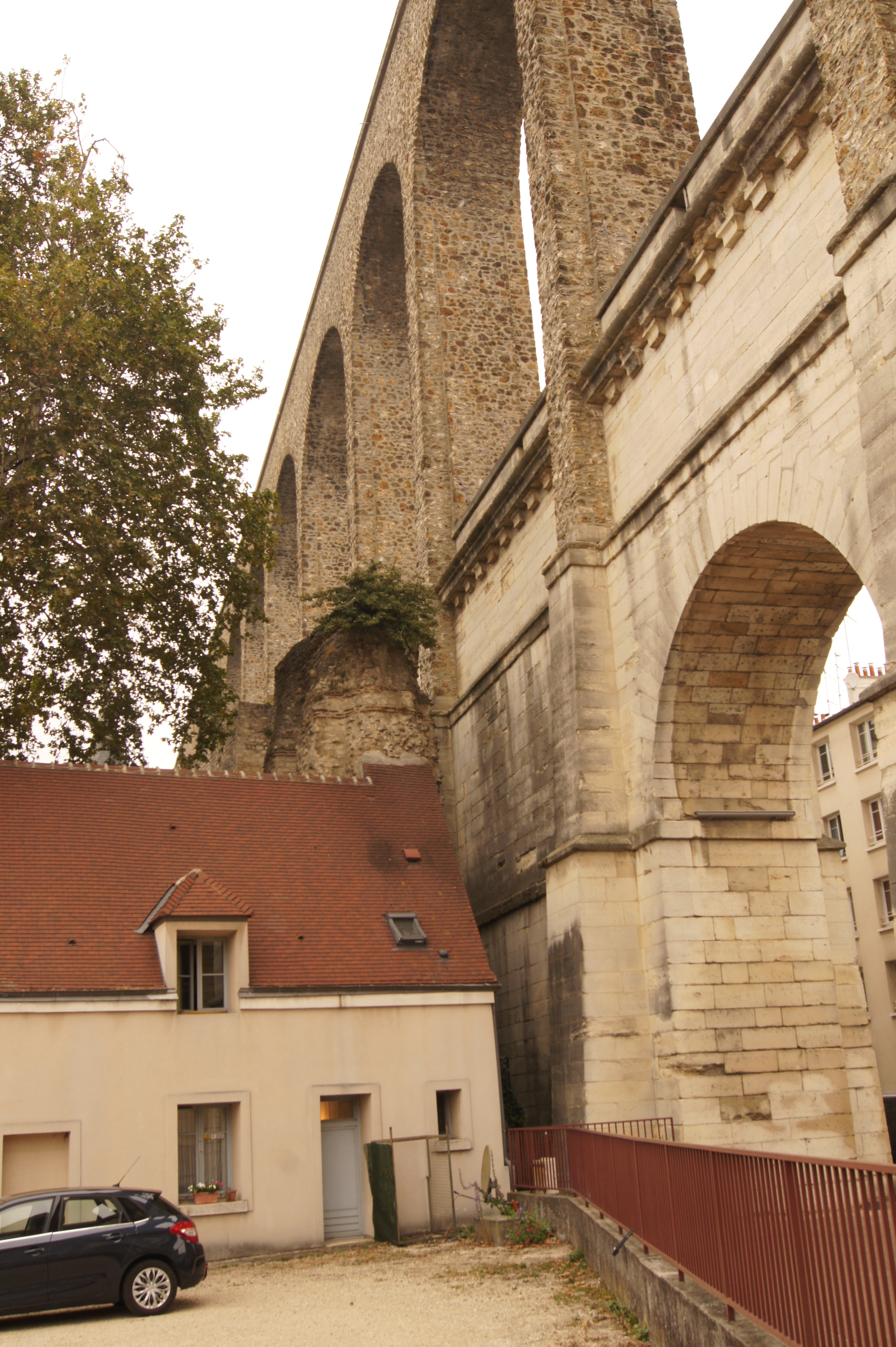
Roman Aqueduct of Lutetia

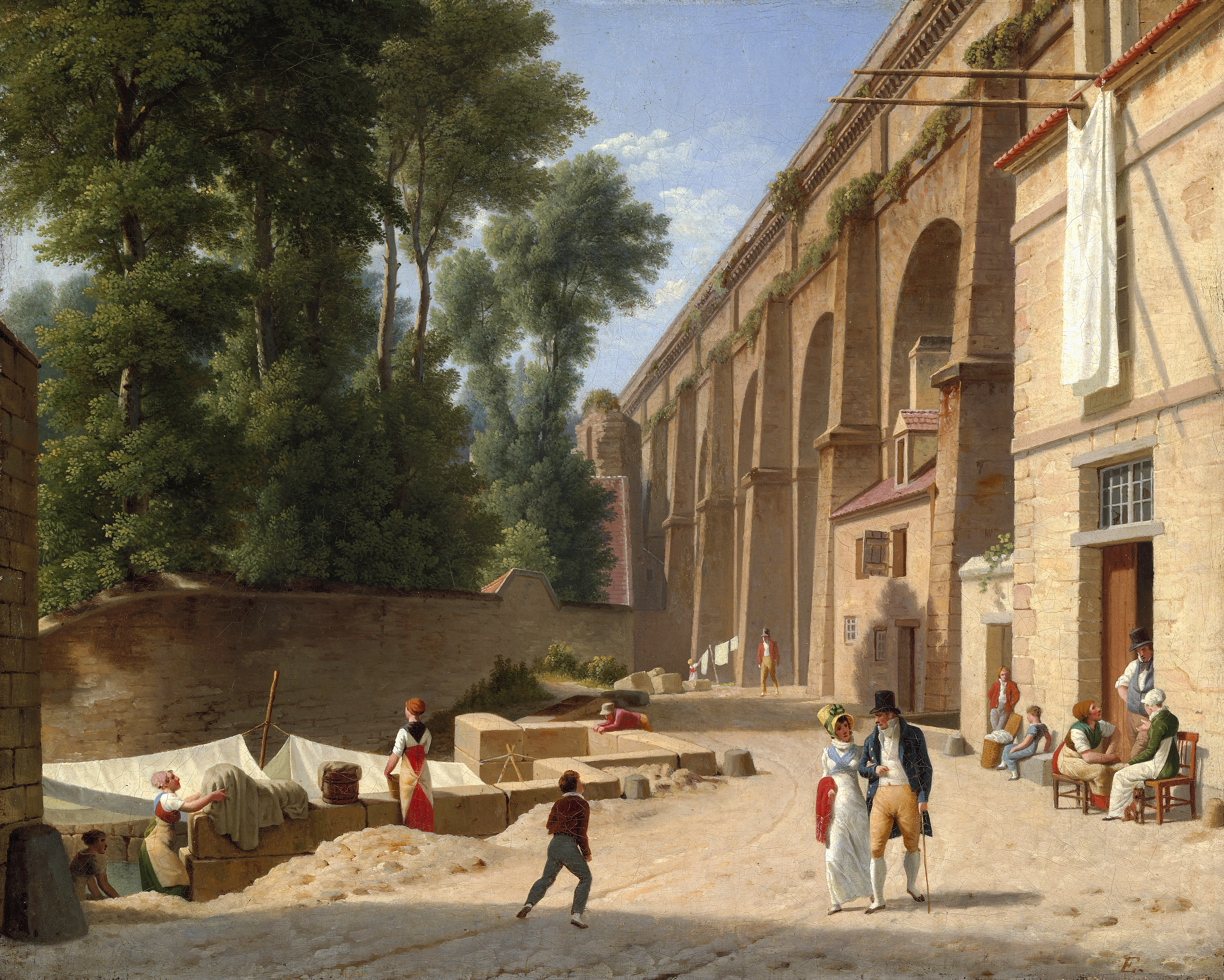
C.W. Eckersberg painting from 1812 showing remains of arches of Roman aqueduct

The arches of the Roman aqueduct crossed the Bièvre valley near Arcueil and are still visible at the Chateau des Arcs.

Between 1613 and 1624 a bridge-aqueduct over 1,300 ft (400 m). long was constructed to convey water from the spring of Rungis, south of Arcueil, across the river Bièvre to the Luxembourg Palace in Paris. Between 1868 and 1872 another aqueduct, still longer, was superimposed above that of the 17th century, forming part of the system conveying water from the river Vanne to Paris.

The commune of Arcueil was officially renamed Arcueil-Cachan in 1894, after the hamlet of Cachan located within the commune. On 26 December 1922, Cachan seceded from the commune of Arcueil-Cachan and became a commune in its own right. The reduced commune of Arcueil-Cachan was renamed simply Arcueil.

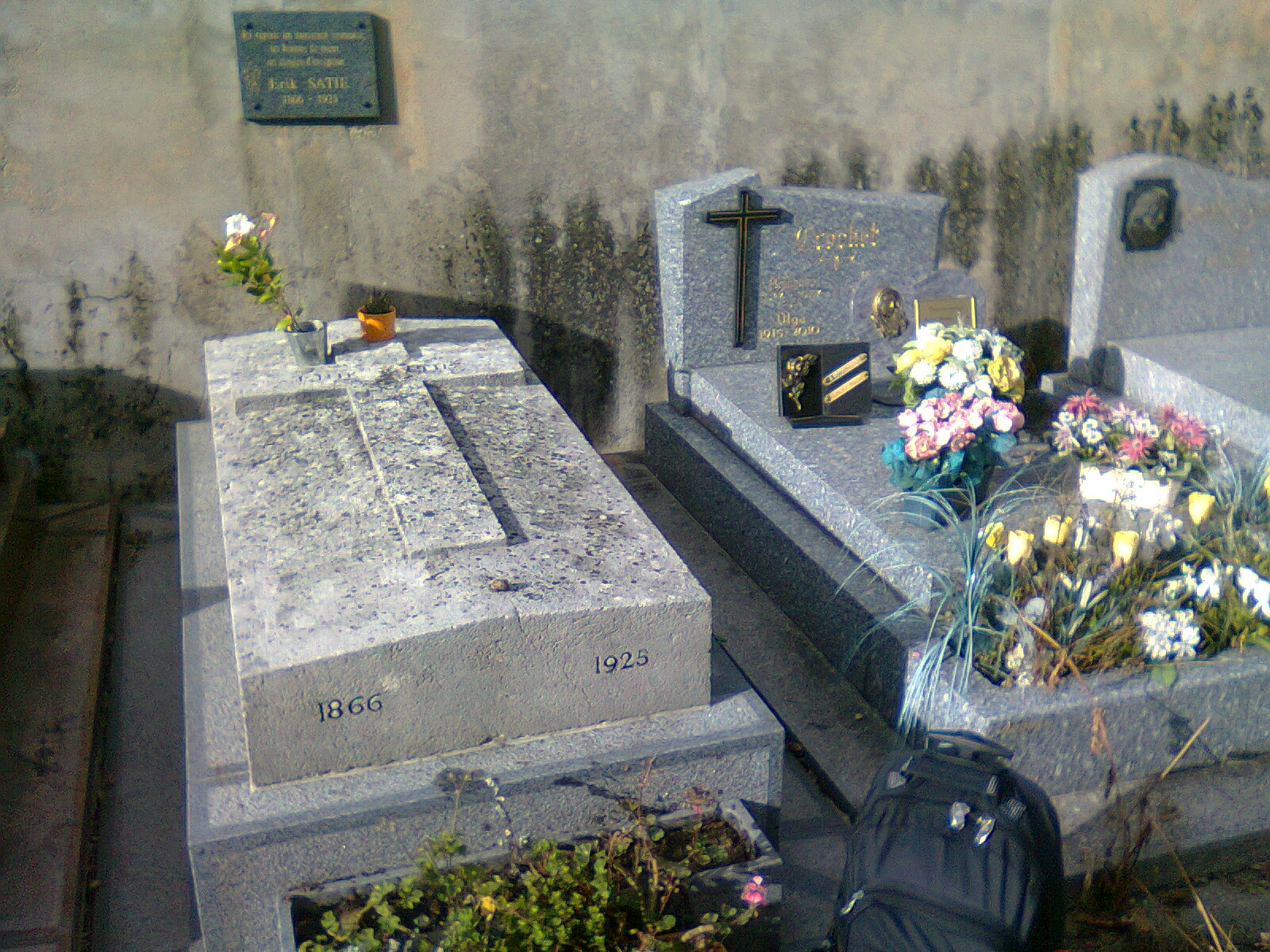
Tomb of Erik Satie

== Economy ==
Orange France, formerly France Télécom S.A., had its registered address in Arcueil.

La Compagnie (DreamJet SAS) formerly was headquartered in Arcueil.

== Geography ==
The commune of Arcueil covers an area of 233 ha (0.90 sq mi). Its highest elevation is 105 m (344 ft), its lowest point is 42 m (138 ft).

Arcueil is served by two stations on Paris RER line B: Laplace and Arcueil-Cachan.

== Education ==
Primary schools:

- Five preschools: Henri Barbusse, Danielle Casanova, Jules Ferry, Olympe de Gouges, and Pauline Kergomard
- Five elementary schools: Henri Barbusse, Jules Ferry, Olympe de Gouges, Aimé Césaire, and Jean Macé

There is one junior high school, Collège Dulcie September and an engineering College, the École supérieure d'ingénieurs des travaux de la construction de Paris.

Residents are served by the Lycée intercommunal Darius-Milhaud in Le Kremlin-Bicêtre.

== Personalities ==
- Jean-Antoine de Baïf (1532–1589), member of the "Pléiade".
- Adrienne Bolland (1895–1975), first woman to fly an airplane across the Andes, was born in Arcueil.
- Claude Louis Berthollet (1748–1822), chemist.
- Michel Bulteau, writer and cult film maker, is a native of Arcueil.
- Augustin-Louis Cauchy (1789–1857), a prominent mathematician, fled to Arcueil from Paris with his royalist parents during the French Revolution and the Reign of Terror.
- Pierre and Marie Curie installed at Arcueil an annex of the Institut du Radium for the chemical treatment of radioactive elements.
- Jean-Paul Gaultier, fashion designer.
- Pierre-Simon de Laplace (1749–1827), mathematician, astronomer and physicist.
- Henri Rousseau (1844–1910) also called "Douanier Rousseau", notable naive painter.
- The Marquis de Sade, writer and libertine.
- Erik Satie, composer, lived in Arcueil from 1898 to 1925. He is buried in the town.
- Dulcie September, of the African National Congress, lodged in Arcueil while living in France; an Arcueil high school is named after her.

== Population ==
Data before 1922 in the table and graph below refer to the old commune Arcueil(-Cachan), before the commune of Cachan was separated.

Historical population

Year	Pop.	±% p.a.
1793	1,338	—
1800	1,168	−1.92%
1806	1,200	+0.45%
1821	1,439	+1.22%
1831	1,809	+2.31%
1836	1,746	−0.71%
1841	1,734	−0.14%
1846	2,701	+9.27%
1851	3,071	+2.60%
1856	2,957	−0.75%
1861	4,078	+6.64%
1866	5,024	+4.26%
1872	5,258	+0.76%
1876	5,299	+0.19%
1881	6,067	+2.74%
1886	6,465	+1.28%
1891	6,088	−1.19%
1896	7,064	+3.02%
1901	8,425	+3.59%

Year	Pop.	±% p.a.
1906	9,237	+1.86%
1911	11,319	+4.15%
1921	14,966	+2.83%
1926	12,559	−3.45%
1931	16,200	+5.22%
1936	16,590	+0.48%
1946	16,340	−0.15%
1954	18,067	+1.26%
1962	20,224	+1.42%
1968	21,877	+1.32%
1975	20,330	−1.04%
1982	20,064	−0.19%
1990	20,334	+0.17%
1999	18,061	−1.31%
2007	19,592	+1.02%
2012	19,526	−0.07%
2017	21,501	+1.95%
2023	22,200	+0.53%

Source: EHESS and INSEE (1968–2023)

== See also ==
- Society of Arcueil
- Communes of the Val-de-Marne department
- Aqueducs d'Arcueil et de Cachan French Wiki article on the history of the 3 aqueducts
