= Claude Le Coz =

French Catholic bishop

- Archbishop of Besançon
- Church: Catholic Church
- Archdiocese: Archdiocese of Besançon
- In office: 29 April 1802 – 3 May 1815
- Predecessor: Raymond de Durfort
- Successor: Gabriel Cortois de Pressigny

Orders
- Consecration: 10 April 1791 by Jean-Baptiste Massieu

Personal details
- Born: 22 December 1740 Plonévez-Porzay, Brittany, Kingdom of France
- Died: 3 May 1815 (aged 74) Villevieux, Jura, French Empire

Claude Le Coz (22 December 1740 – 3 May 1815) was a French Catholic bishop.

== Biography ==
Le Coz was born at Plonévez-Porzay, in present-day Finistère. He was pupil, then professor, and finally principal of the Collège de Quimper. He took the constitutional oath in 1791, was elected constitutional bishop of Ille-et-Vilaine, and wrote in defence of his election — declared null and void by the pope — Accord des vrais principes de la morale et de la raison sur la Constitution civile du clergé.

Elected to the Legislative Assembly, he defended Catholic colleges, the ecclesiastical costume, and Christian marriage against the majority. His positions drew upon him the severity of the Convention, and he spent fourteen months in the prison of Mont-Saint-Michel. Later, under the Directory, the vigour with which he opposed the substitution of the decadi for the Christian Sunday came near causing his deportation.

Under the Concordat of 1802, Le Coz was one of the Constitutional bishops whom the force of circumstances compelled the Holy See to recognize, and he became Archbishop of Besançon. Bernier, the ecclesiastical diplomat who negotiated the rehabilitation of the jurors, thought it best, in order to avoid delay, not to make a clear mention of the manner of retractation required by Pope Pius VII; as a consequence, Le Coz denied ever having retracted, and the awkwardness of the situation was ended only by a personal interview between Le Coz and Pius VII, in which both were seen weeping but of which neither ever spoke.

As schismatic Bishop of Ille-et-Vilaine, Le Coz failed in his endeavour to organize the new province of which he was the metropolitan; otherwise he proved a zealous administrator and a charitable pastor. The strange mixture in Le Coz's life, is partly explained by his intensely Gallican education, which caused him to adopt and to maintain with obstinacy schismatic views. His Gallicanism, which made him so haughty toward the pope, found him almost cringing before the various political regimes which succeeded one another during his episcopate. Le Coz, even against the all-powerful Henri Grégoire, defended the cause of religion in the Annales de la Religion, in which he was a collaborator, and in his Correspondance, part of which has been published. He died at Villevieux, Jura.

== Sources ==
- Alfred Roussel, Le Coz, évêque d'Ille-et-Vilaine (Paris, s.d.)
- idem, Correspondance de Le Coz (Paris, 1900)
- Paul Pisani, Le Coz in Répertoire biographique de l'Episcopat Constitutionnel (Paris, 1907)
