= De Quincy =

De Quincy, De Quincey, DeQuincy, or DeQuincey is a name. It can occur as both a masculine given name and as a surname. Geographically, it can be found in the United Kingdom, France, the United States, and New Zealand.

Notable people with this name include:

== De Quincy ==
- Barthélemy de Quincy (died 1302), a marshal of the Knights Templar
- Charles Sevin de Quincy (1660? – 1738), a French artillery general
- Margaret de Quincy, Countess of Lincoln (c. 1206 – 1266), an English noblewoman
- Quatremère de Quincy (1755 – 1849), a French archaeologist and writer
- Robert de Quincy (c. 1140 – c. 1197), an English and Scottish nobleman
- Roger de Quincy, 2nd Earl of Winchester (c. 1195 – 1264), a Scottish earl
- Saer de Quincy, 1st Earl of Winchester (c. 1155 – 1219), also a Scottish earl

== De Quincey ==
- Christian de Quincey, an American author
- Gabriel Cortois de Quincey (1714 – 1791), a French bishop
- Paul Frederick de Quincey (1828 – 1894), a New Zealand politician
- Richard de Quincey (1896 – 1965), a British cattle breeder
- Thomas De Quincey (1785 – 1859), an English essayist

== DeQuincy ==
- DeQuincy Scott (born 1978), an American football player

== DeQuincey ==
- I. DeQuincey Newman (1911 – 1985), an American activist, pastor, and senator

== See also ==
- DeQuincy, Louisiana, U.S., a city
  - DeQuincy High School, a high school in the city
- Quincy (disambiguation)
