= Max Ingrand =

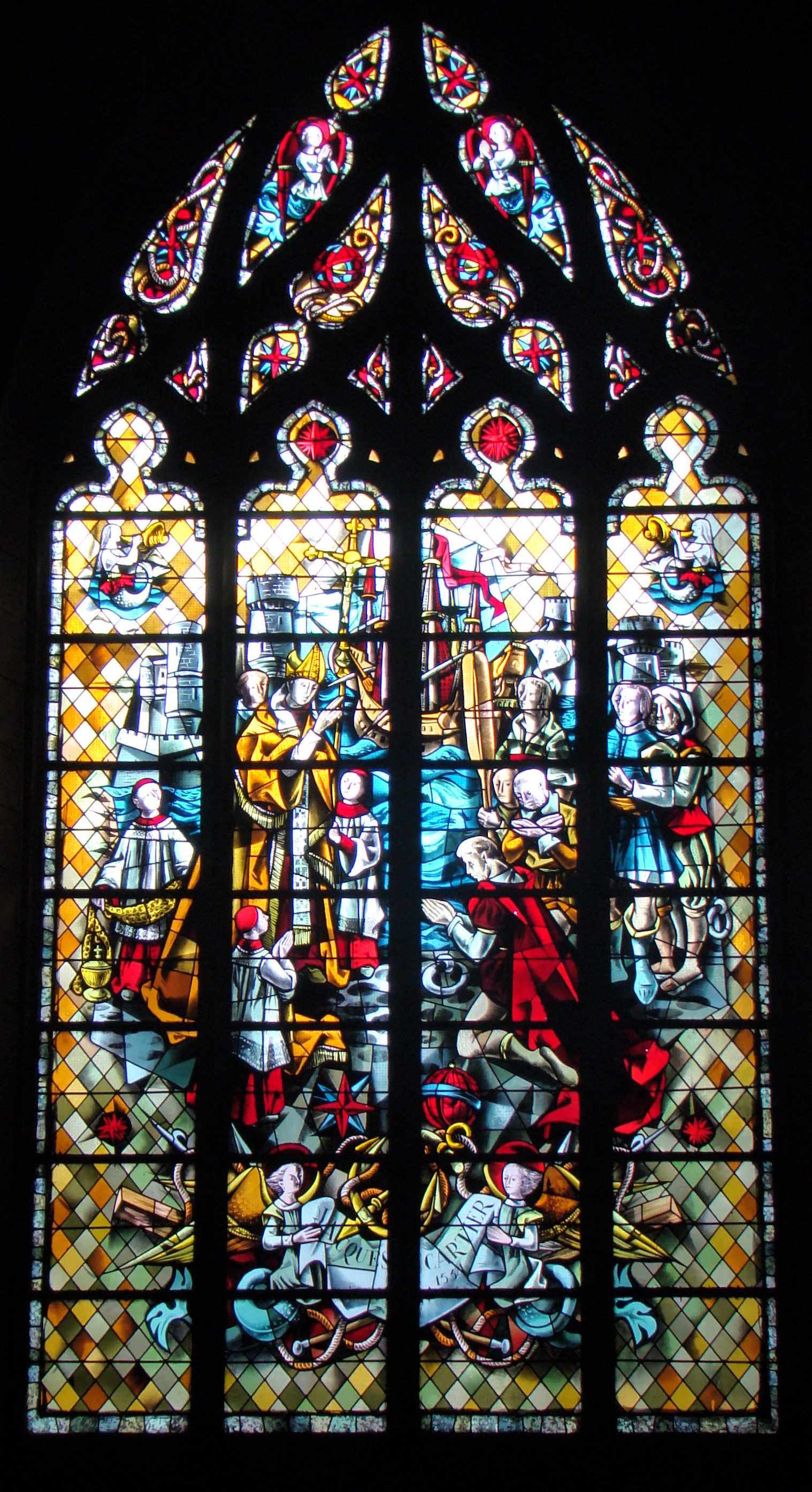
Window in Saint-Malo Cathedral, depicting Jacques Cartier being blessed by bishop Denis Briçonnet before setting out on his 1534 voyage of discovery.

Maurice Max-Ingrand, better known as Max Ingrand (20 December 1908, Bressuire – 25 August 1969, Paris) was a French artist and decorator, known for his work in studio glass and his stained glass windows.

He was educated at the École nationale supérieure des beaux-arts and École nationale supérieure des arts décoratifs, studying under Jacques Grüber and Charles Lemaresquier. He married Paulette Rouquié (1910−1997) in 1931. He worked with his wife in glass etching, exhibiting work at the 21st Société des artistes décorateurs in 1931.

Ingrand began to work in stained glass windows for private commissions. His first church windows were for Sainte-Agnès, Maisons-Alfort and participating in the design for Notre-Dame de Paris in 1937. He was drafted for military service in 1939 and fell into Nazi captivity at Hoyerswerda in May 1940. He returned from captivity only in 1945. He divorced his wife in 1946 and married Marie-Alberte Madre-Rey, with whom he had two children. In the aftermath of World War II, he was tasked with replacing 47 of the stained glass windows destroyed at Notre-Dame de Paris.

He was artistic director of Milano interior design company Fontana Arte during 1954–1967. He was elected president of the French scouting association (Association Française de l'Éclairage) in 1968. He founded the company Verre Lumière, one of the first producers of halogen lamps, in 1968.

Ingrand created numerous church stained glass windows during the late 1940s to 1960s (in some cases replacing windows that had been destroyed in World War II) including windows in Pontoise Cathedral (1955), Strasbourg Cathedral (1956), the chapels of Château de Blois (1957), Château d'Amboise, Château de Chenonceau and Château de Caen, Saint-Pierre de Yvetot (at 1046 m^{2} the largest stained glass window in Europe), Saint-Pierre de Montmartre, Rouen Cathedral, Beauvais Cathedral, Saint-Malo Cathedral, Tours Cathedral, Church of the Jacobins, Münster Cathedral (1961), Liège Cathedral (1968), São Paulo Cathedral, St. Mary of the Woods Catholic Church in Chicago (1966), Washington National Cathedral (with Claude Serre), Cathedral of the Risen Christ (Lincoln, Nebraska) (1964), St. Dominic Church in San Francisco, the Basilica of the Annunciation, Nazareth. Ingrand also designed the Sanctification Dome in the Basilica of the National Shrine of the Immaculate Conception (1959).

Max Ingrand was noted for his modern designs. This can be seen in the stained-glass windows behind the main altar at the Basilica of St Michel Church in Bordeaux (Ref: https://ourtapestry.blog/basilique-of-saint-michel-2/).

Ingrand died unexpectedly from influenza in Paris in 1969.

== In popular culture ==
Ingrand's windows at St. Mary of the Woods Catholic Church was the subject matter for the mini-series, The Marian Stained Glass Windows.
