= Claude Serre =

French cartoonist (1938–1998)

Claude Serre (10 November 1938 – 13 November 1998) was a French cartoonist, born in Sucy-en-Brie, Val-de-Marne.

== Biography ==
After academic studies, he studied the craft of stained glass for eight years under Max Ingrand, along with his cousin Jean Gourmelin. He then started drawing cartoons and became an illustrator for many French journals, including Plexus, Planet, Hara-Kiri, Lui, Pariscope and La Vie Electrique. He also began illustrating books. The first was Asunrath, a work of fantasy, published by Losfeld.

He incorporated his interest in the fantastic into many of his early lithographs, which were published, sometimes exclusively, in many countries including Japan and Germany. He also participated in both group and solo exhibitions.

In 1969, he met Jack Claude Nezat, and they became friends. Nezat wrote numerous articles devoted to his art and his work and organized two exhibitions in Germany in 1975 and 1976–1977 that met with great success. This relationship also allowed Serre to work with the magazine Pardon.

Serre, meanwhile, started drawing cartoons on such topics as medicine, sports, automobiles and DIY, and his first book of cartoons, Black Humor and Men in White, satirising medical professionals, was published in 1972 by Editions Grésivaudan. The book won the Black Humor prize.

A number of similar-themed books in the same vein were published by Glénat of Grenoble. He also continued to work as an illustrator and worked in particular on books by Francis Blanche and Frederic Dard, author of the San Antonio series.

=== Death ===
Serre died of a brain tumour at the age of 60 in Caen, Calvados.

== Bibliography ==
Albums (Glénat, Editor in Grenoble, France)

- 1981 : L'automobile (The Car)
- 1983 : Savoir vivre
- 1985 : Petits anges (Little Angels)
- 1986 : Zoo au logis
- 1988 : Rechute
- 1991 : La forme olympique (The Olympic Form)
- 1995 : Chasse et pêche
- 1995 : La chasse (coffret édition de luxe)
- 1995 : La pêche (coffret édition de luxe)
- 1996 : Faites vos jeux (en collaboration avec Bridenne)
- 1997 : Le dico des maux
- Tome 1: traitements et remèdes (préface Frédéric Dard)
- 1999 : Coffret animaux
- 1999 : Coffret autobrico
- 1999 : L'humour chronique de Serre
- 2001 : Humour noir et hommes en blanc (Black Humor and Men in White)
- 2001 : Le livre d'or de Serre (Serre's Golden Book)
- 2002 : Le sport (Sport)
- 2002 : Vice compris
- 2002 : Le bricolage
- 2003 : Musiques (Music)
- 2003 : La bouffe
- 2004 : Les vacances
- 2004 : La forme olympique (The Olympic Form)
- 2005 : Petits anges (Little Angels)
