= Thomas Poussin =

French architect

Thomas Poussin was a 17th-century French architect.

Born in Dinan, he worked on the north side of the Saint-Malo Cathedral from 1595 to 1607, as well as on military constructions in Dinan, Saint-Malo and the region. He participated in the construction of the Palace of the Parlement of Rennes from 1624 to 1631.

== Sources ==
- Jacques Salbert, Ateliers de retabliers lavallois aux XVIIe and XVIIIe: études historiques et artistiques, Presses Universitaires de Rennes, 1976.
