= John of the Grating =

French Roman Catholic saint

Saint John of the Grating
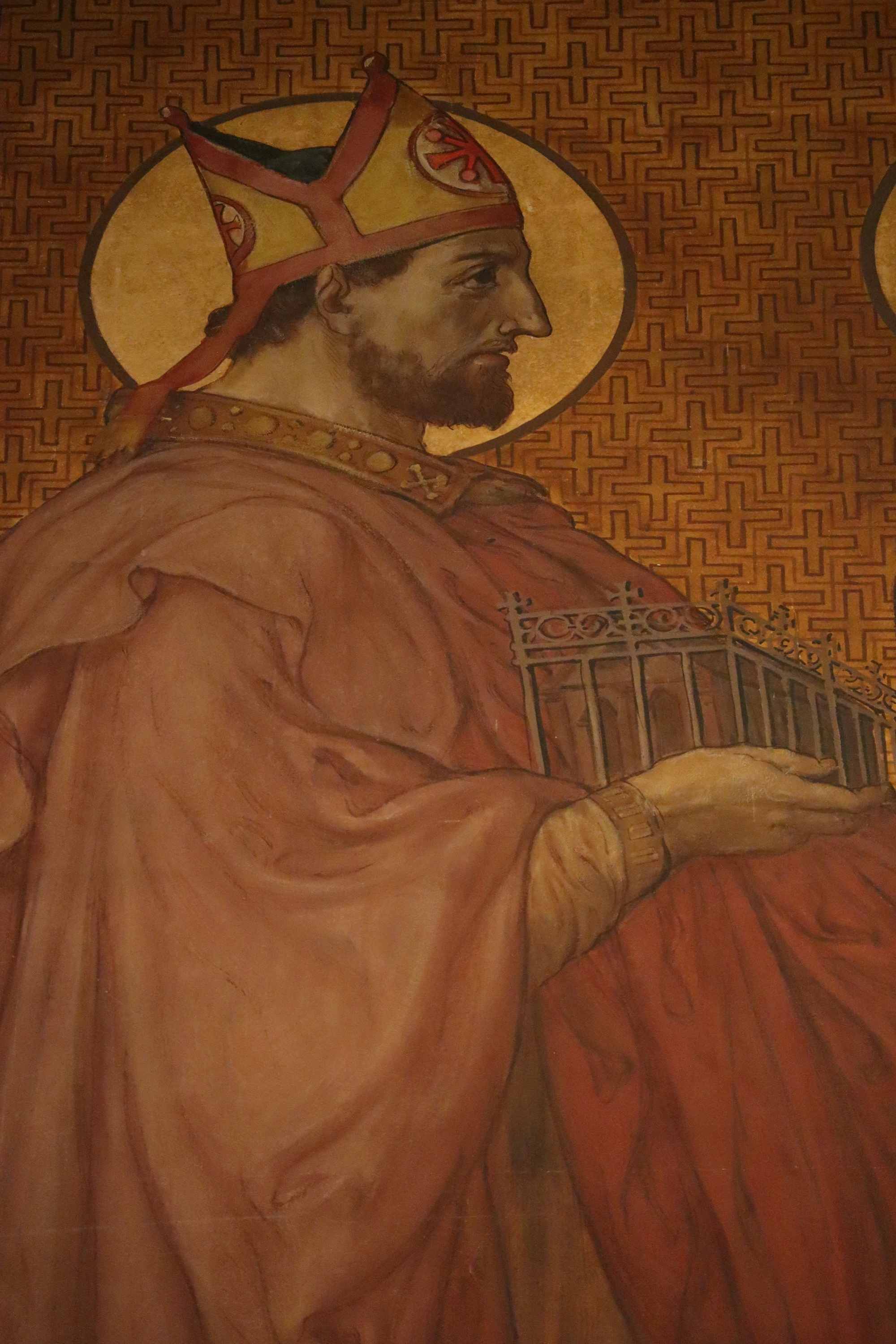
- John of the Grating, detail from Procession des saints de Bretagne (1871–1876) by Alphonse Le Hénaff

Bishop of Aleth
- Born: 1098; Brittany, France
- Died: February 1, 1163
- Venerated in: Roman Catholic Church
- Canonized: 1517 by Cultus confirmed by Pope Leo X
- Feast: 1 February

John of the Grating (Latin: Johannes a Craticula, French: Jean de Châtillon; died 1163) was a Cistercian Bishop of Aleth. He moved his episcopal see to Saint-Malo to protect it from pirates.

== Life ==
John was born in Brittany in 1098. He was made bishop of Aleth in 1144. As bishop his life was embittered by a series of lawsuits with the monks of Marmoutiers. He wished to remove the episcopal see to St. Malo, Aleth being exposed to pirates. But the monks claimed the Church of St. Malo, the pope decided in their favor, and, at length, Pope Lucius II deprived John of his see. He then retired under the protection of Bernard to Clairvaux, until, on the death of Lucius, a monk of Clairvaux (Eugenius III) was elevated to the papal throne. John appealed again and was heard. His rights were restored, and the monks of Marmoutiers were obliged to cede the Church of St. Malo to the bishop.

In 1146, John transferred his bishopric to Saint-Malo with the approval of Pope Eugene III. The monastery of Saint Malo, founded in 1108, became the bishop's official residence and the monastery became a cathedral replacing the previous cathedral of Saint-Pierre at Aleth. All that is left of the Cathedral of Saint-Pierre is some stone ruins.

During his tenure he had to deal with the strange heresy of the fanatical Éon de l'Étoile. John tried by persuasion and instruction to disabuse of their heresy such of the enthusiasts as overran his diocese, and succeeded in converting many.

He would go on to found Sainte-Croix de Guingamp and Saint-Jacques de Montfort Abbeys.

John was buried in the Cathédrale Saint-Vincent-de-Saragosse de Saint-Malo, where his relics lie in a stone 12th-century sarcophagus overlooking the ambulatory. He was given the designation "of the Grating", due to the grating, or metal railing, surrounding his shrine to protect it from the many devout pilgrims. He is depicted in a stained glass window on the north side of the nave.
