= Gabriel Cortois de Quincey =

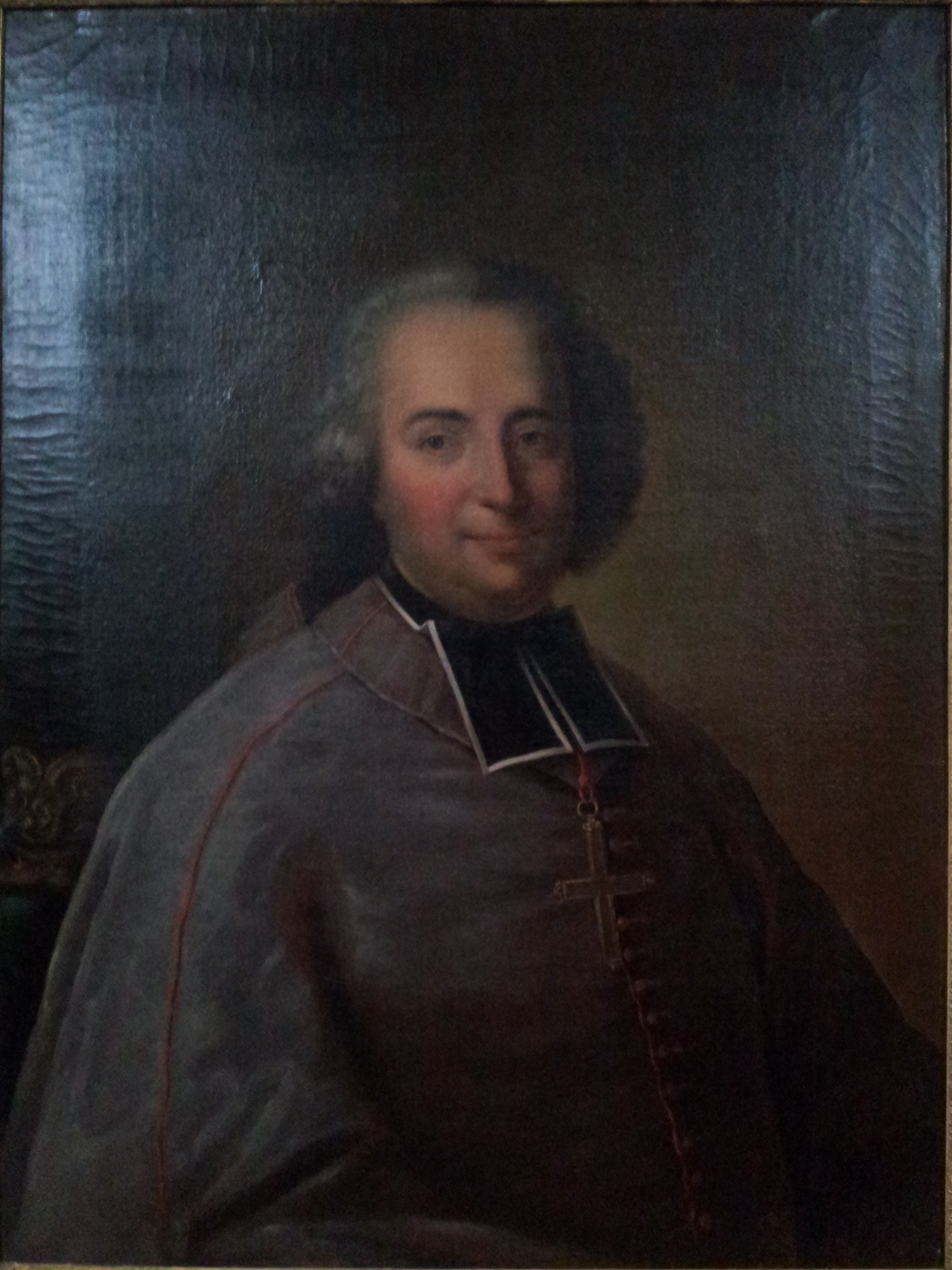
- Born: 1714; Dijon, France
- Died: January 14, 1791 (aged 76–77); Belley, France
- Occupation: Bishop
- Parents: Antoine Cortois-Humbert (father); Anne Guillaume (mother)

Gabriel Cortois de Quincey (born in Dijon in 1714, died in Belley on January 14, 1791), clergyman, was Bishop of Belley from 1751 to 1791, the last of the Ancien Régime.

== Biography ==
Gabriel Cortois de Quincey was the third son of Antoine Cortois-Humbert, Baron of Attignat (1738) and Anne Guillaume de Quincey.

Destined for the Church, he was archdeacon and then vicar general of the first Bishop of Dijon and of his successor. In 1746 he was made commendatory abbot of the Abbey of St Martin, Autun.

Named Bishop of Belley in 1751, he was confirmed in the post on July 19 that year and consecrated bishop in August by Guillaume d'Hugues, Archbishop of Vienne. In 1759, he translated the relics of Saint Anthelme. In 1762 he took the part of the Jesuits. In 1764 he was made commendatory abbot of the Abbey of Conches in the diocese of Évreux. In 1772 as the representative of the Holy See, he presided over the general chapter of the Friars Minor in Grenoble. In 1783 he was made commendatory abbot of the Abbey of the Abbey of Ambronay in the diocese of Lyons.

After the promulgation of the Civil Constitution of the Clergy he refused to take the oath it prescribed but he continued to reside in the episcopal residence, which he himself had rebuilt. He died on January 14, 1791, before the election of the Constitutional bishop Jean-Baptiste Royer. In later years a funerary monument to him was erected by two nephew who were bishops: Pierre-Marie-Magdeleine Cortois de Balore, Bishop of Nîmes, and Gabriel Cortois de Pressigny, Bishop of Saint-Malo. The latter was the son of Gabriel senior's elder brother Claude-Antoine, coseigneur of Quincey. and was later to become Archbishop of Besançon.
