= John of Châtillon =

John of Châtillon or Jean de Châtillon may refer to:

- John of the Grating (died 1163), also called John of Châtillon, bishop of Aleth
- John I, Count of Blois (died 1280), of the House of Blois-Châtillon
- John of Châtillon (theologian) (died 1298)
- John, Count of Saint-Pol (died 1344), of the House of Châtillon
- John of Châtillon (1283–1363), Grand Master of France
- John II, Count of Blois (died 1381), of the House of Blois-Châtillon
- Jean de Laval-Châtillon (died 1398), knight, ancestor of Queen Jeanne de Laval
- John I, Count of Penthièvre (died 1404), of the House of Blois-Châtillon
- John II, Count of Penthièvre (died 1454), of the House of Blois-Châtillon
