= Sucy-en-Brie =

- Commune
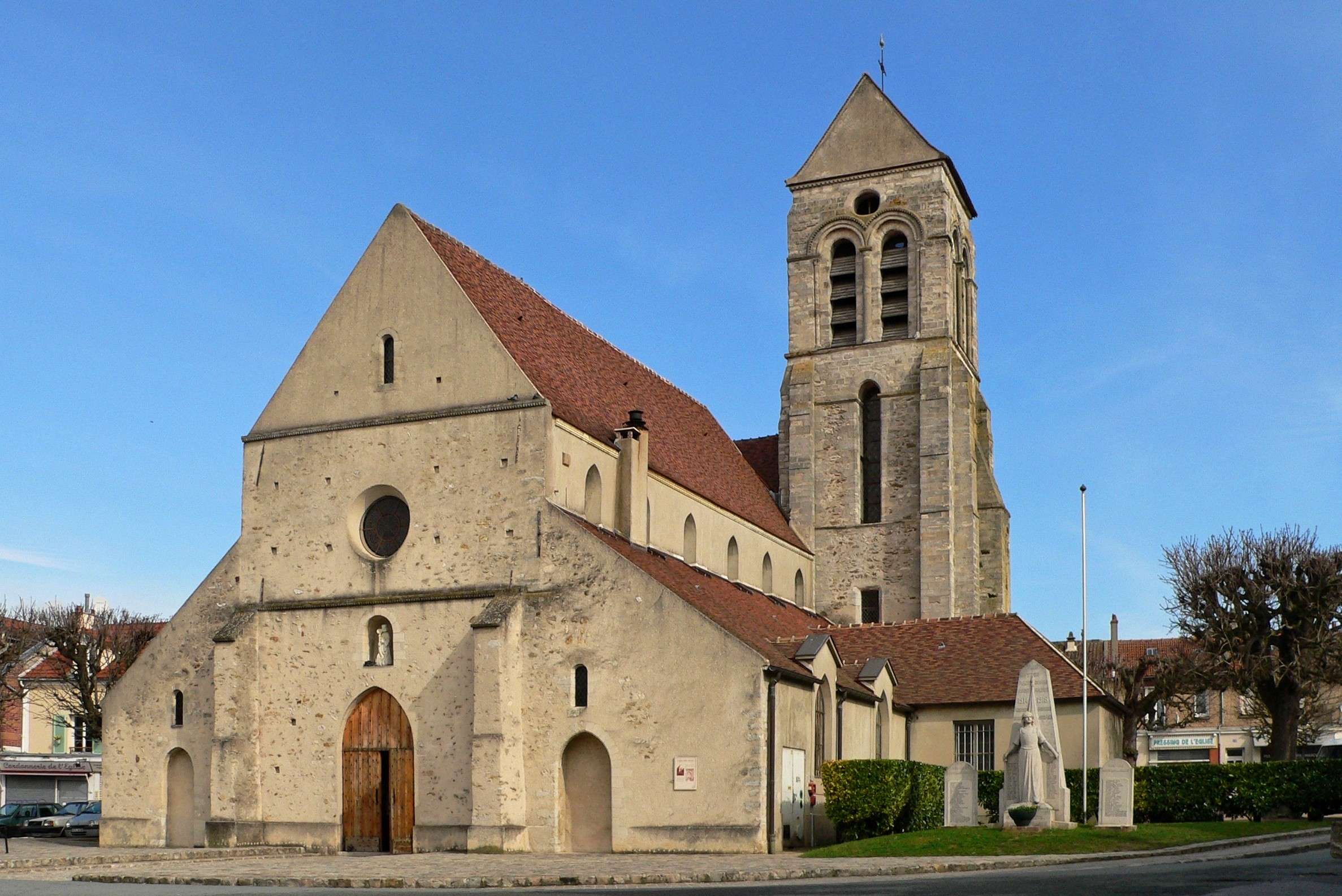
- The church of Sucy-en-Brie, an historical monument

- Coat of arms

- Location (in red) within Paris inner suburbs
- Location of Sucy-en-Brie
- Location within France Location within Île-de-France (region)
- Coordinates: 48°46′11″N 2°31′22″E
- Country: France
- Region: Île-de-France
- Department: Val-de-Marne
- Arrondissement: Créteil
- Canton: Saint-Maur-des-Fossés-2
- Intercommunality: Grand Paris

Government
  - Mayor (2026–32): David Perre
- Area^{1}: 10.43 km^{2} (4.03 sq mi)
- Population (2023): 27,764
  - Density: 2,662/km^{2} (6,894/sq mi)
- Time zone: UTC+01:00 (CET)
  - Summer (DST): UTC+02:00 (CEST)
- INSEE/Postal code: 94071 /94370
- ^{1} French Land Register data, which excludes lakes, ponds, glaciers > 1 km^{2} (0.386 sq mi or 247 acres) and river estuaries.

Sucy-en-Brie (French pronunciation: [sysi ɑ̃ bʁi], literally Sucy in Brie) is a commune in the southeastern suburbs of Paris, France. It is located 15.4 km (9.6 mi) from the center of Paris.

== Toponymy ==
The name Sucy derives from the Latin Sulciacum, probably meaning the 'estate of Sucius', a Gallo-Roman landowner.

== History ==
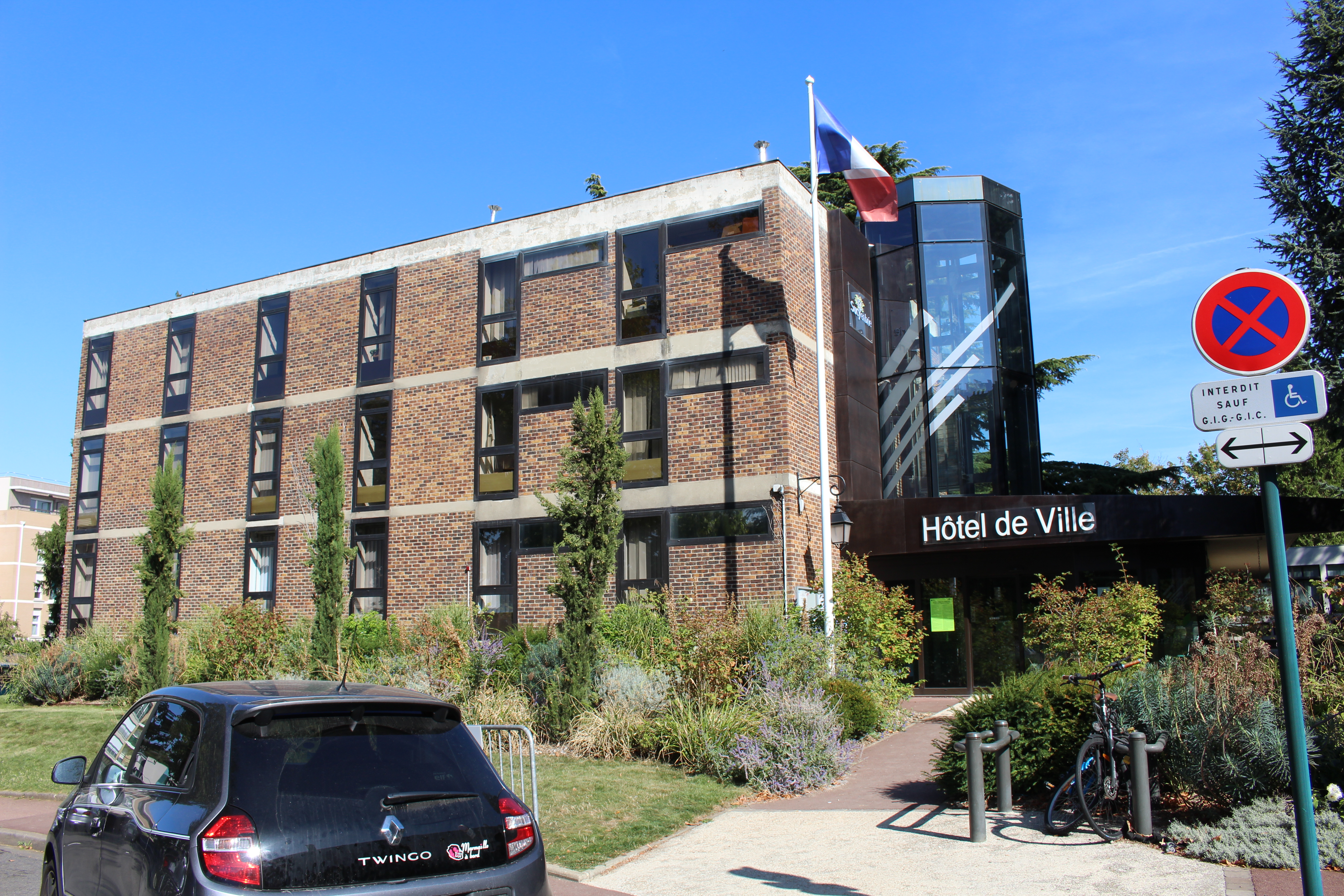
The reception block of the Hôtel de Ville

The Hôtel de Ville is located at the Château de Haute-Maison which dates back at least to 1599.

== Population ==
Historical population

Year	Pop.	±% p.a.
1793	1,063	—
1800	1,107	+0.58%
1806	1,117	+0.15%
1821	1,176	+0.34%
1831	1,266	+0.74%
1836	1,191	−1.21%
1841	1,175	−0.27%
1846	1,204	+0.49%
1851	1,136	−1.16%
1856	1,155	+0.33%
1861	1,286	+2.17%
1866	1,327	+0.63%
1872	1,072	−3.49%
1876	1,130	+1.33%
1881	1,368	+3.90%
1886	1,228	−2.14%
1891	1,229	+0.02%
1896	1,450	+3.36%
1901	1,531	+1.09%

Year	Pop.	±% p.a.
1906	1,736	+2.55%
1911	2,091	+3.79%
1921	2,573	+2.10%
1926	4,643	+12.53%
1931	6,113	+5.66%
1936	6,883	+2.40%
1946	6,825	−0.08%
1954	8,570	+2.89%
1962	13,258	+5.61%
1968	17,206	+4.44%
1975	21,984	+3.56%
1982	23,379	+0.88%
1990	25,839	+1.26%
1999	24,812	−0.45%
2007	26,070	+0.62%
2012	25,900	−0.13%
2017	26,472	+0.44%
2023	27,764	+0.80%

Source: EHESS and INSEE (1968-2023)

== Transport ==
Sucy-en-Brie is served by Sucy–Bonneuil station on Paris RER line A.

== Education ==
Public primary schools in the commune include:

- 9 preschools (maternelles) and one private preschool
- 8 elementary schools and one private elementary school

Public secondary schools in the commune include:

- Junior high schools: Collège du Fort and Collège du Parc
- Senior high schools/sixth-form colleges: Lycée Christoph Colombe and Lycée des Métiers Hôteliers Montaleau

In addition Lycée Guillaume Budé is in nearby Limeil-Brévannes.

The commune owns the Château de Sucy-en-Brie, which is used as a conservatory of music.

There is one private Catholic school, Ensemble scolaire du Petit-Val, which covers levels preschool through senior high.

== Personalities ==
- Christophe Lemoine, voice actor
- Nicolas Maurice-Belay, footballer
- Angelin Preljocaj (1957), dancer and choreographer
- Claude Serre (1938-1998), cartoonist

== Twin towns ==
It is twinned with Camberley in Surrey, England as well as Scituate, Massachusetts.

== See also ==
- Communes of the Val-de-Marne department
