= Yvetot =

- Commune
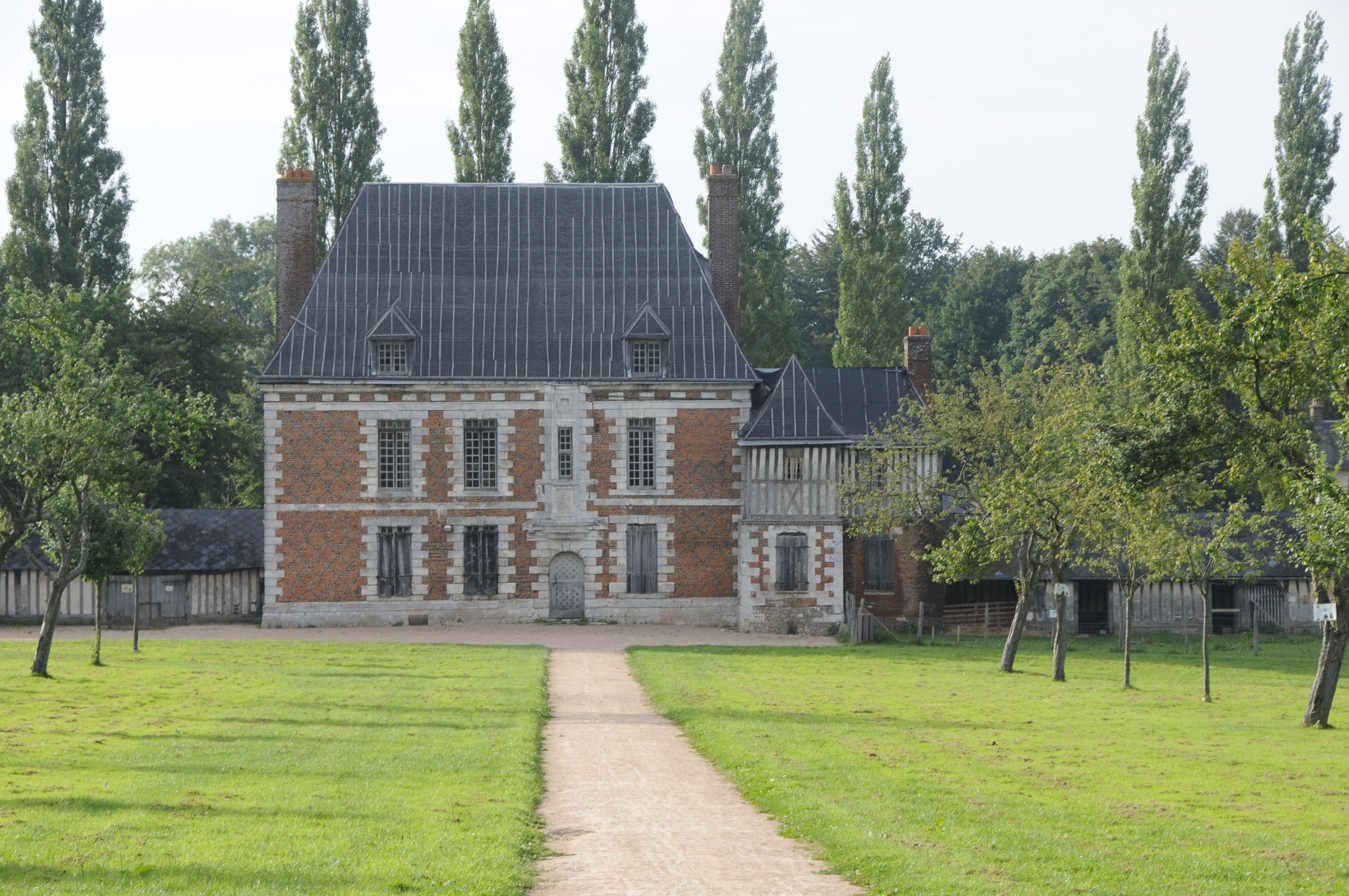
- Le Fay Manor in Yvetot

- Coat of arms
- Location of Yvetot
- Location within France Location within Normandy
- Coordinates: 49°37′N 0°45′E
- Country: France
- Region: Normandy
- Department: Seine-Maritime
- Arrondissement: Rouen
- Canton: Yvetot
- Intercommunality: Yvetot Normandie

Government
  - Mayor (2022–2026): Francis Alabert
- Area^{1}: 7.47 km^{2} (2.88 sq mi)
- Elevation: 146 m (479 ft)
- Highest elevation: 157 m (515 ft)
- Lowest elevation: 83 m (272 ft)
- Population (2023): 11,438
  - Density: 1,530/km^{2} (3,970/sq mi)
- Time zone: UTC+01:00 (CET)
  - Summer (DST): UTC+02:00 (CEST)
- INSEE/Postal code: 76758 /76190
- ^{1} French Land Register data, which excludes lakes, ponds, glaciers > 1 km^{2} (0.386 sq mi or 247 acres) and river estuaries.

Yvetot (French pronunciation: [ivto]) is a commune in the Seine-Maritime department in the Normandy region in northern France. It is the capital of the Caux region.

== History ==
The name Yvetot comes from the Germanic Yvo and the Old Norse -topt. Therefore, Yvetot means 'property of Yvo'.

The lords of Yvetot bore the title of king from the 15th until the middle of the 16th century, their petty monarchy being popularized in one of Béranger's songs. In 1592, Henry IV here defeated the troops of the Catholic League.

The town's prosperity was linked to strong commerce, developed as early as the 17th century, thanks to its fiscal statutes and to cotton spinning, which saw massive expansion after 1794. In the 19th century, the town developed fabric production. Until 1926, Yvetot had been chef-lieu of the old arrondissement of Yvetot, and a sub-prefecture. During this period of reorganisation, it lost its status of sub-prefecture. In World War II, Yvetot was practically razed in 1940 by the Germans. Later, the 75th Division of the U.S. Army, 575th Signal Co., maintained its command post in the town from December 14–20, 1944, as it counterattacked against the German army. After the war, Yvetot was rebuilt in a classical style and regained its importance in the middle of the 20th century.

=== Heraldry ===
Arms of Yvetot	The arms of Yvetot are blazoned : Gules, 2 garbs (sheaves of wheat) and 2 shuttles crossed in saltire Or.

== Population ==
Historical population
Year	Pop.	±% p.a.
1968	9,510	—
1975	10,433	+1.33%
1982	10,605	+0.23%
1990	10,807	+0.24%
1999	10,770	−0.04%
2007	11,205	+0.50%
2012	11,644	+0.77%
2017	11,859	+0.37%
2023	11,438	−0.60%
Source: INSEE

== The Round Church and its stained-glass window ==
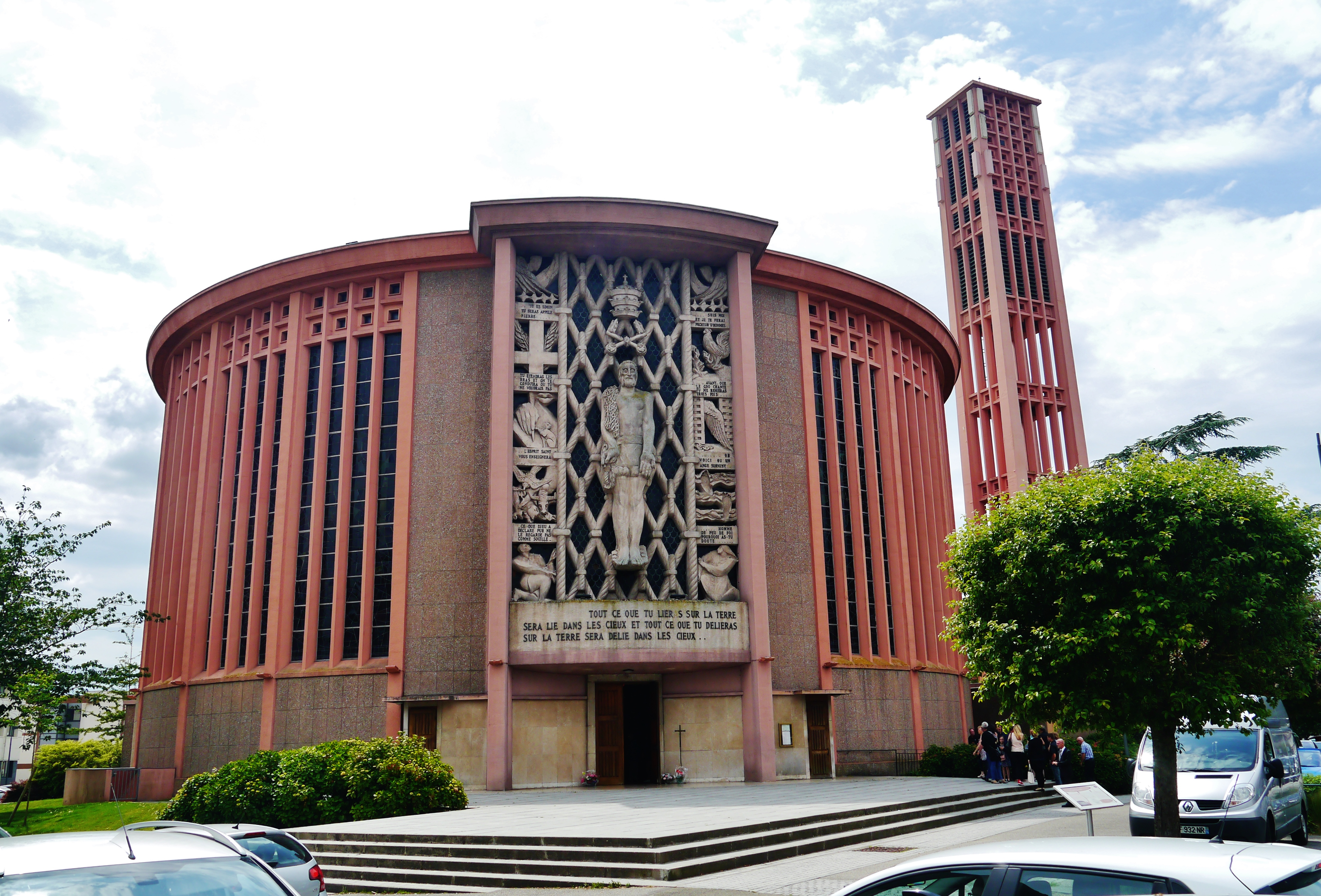
Yvetot's modernist church with its stained glass windows

Having been destroyed during the Second World War, Yvetot's main church of Saint-Pierre was rebuilt in a modernist style by architects Pierre Chirol, Robert Flavigny and Yves Marchand with a circular plan and opened in 1956.

The stained-glass window, considered the largest in Europe with an area of 1,046 m^{2} (11,259 sq ft), was constructed in the 1950s by Max Ingrand. The window's main colors are in shades of crimson, gold and blue. Meticulously assembled from a thousand pieces of glass, the stained-glass window portrays saints, with a wide section consecrated to the Normans of the diocese of Rouen. Either side of Christ are St. Peter (patron saint of Yvetot for a thousand years) and the apostles, including St. Valery (apostle of Vimeu and the Pays de Caux in the Pas de Calais in the 7th century), St. Saëns (an Irish monk and founder of an abbey in the valley of the Varenne), St. Ouen (who introduced monasteries to Rouen) and St. Wandrille of Normandy. The bishops of Rouen are also depicted. Among the bishops are the 7th century Archbishop Saint-Roman (in the process of strangling the "gargoyle", or swamp-dragon, that devastated Rouen), St Rémy, and St Hugues. Others represented in the stained-glass include the Virgin Mary and Joan of Arc shining in her armour.

== Notable people ==
- Louis Pierre Vieillot (1748–1830), ornithologist, was born in Yvetot
- Annie Ernaux, recipient of the 2022 Nobel Prize in Literature, grew up in Yvetot

== Anecdotes ==
Yvetot's entry in the Dictionnaire des idées reçues by Gustave Flaubert, reads: "YVETOT: Voir Yvetot et mourir! ['See Yvetot and die!'] (cf. Naples and Seville)". Compare also the motto of Cassis (Bouches-du-Rhône): "Qu a vist Paris, se noun a vist Cassis, n'a rèn vist", Provençal, meaning "If you've seen Paris and not Cassis, you've not seen anything."

It is in Yvetot that novelist Guy de Maupassant received his primary education; the town itself and its surrounding area, le Pays de Caux feature extensively in his works.

== Twin towns – sister cities ==
Yvetot is twinned with:

- Hemmingen, Germany
- Kyjov, Czech Republic
- Lanark, Scotland, United Kingdom
- Murowana Goślina, Poland

== See also ==
- Communes of the Seine-Maritime department
