= Hôtel de Ville, Sucy-en-Brie =

Town hall in Sucy-en-Brie, France

Hôtel de Ville
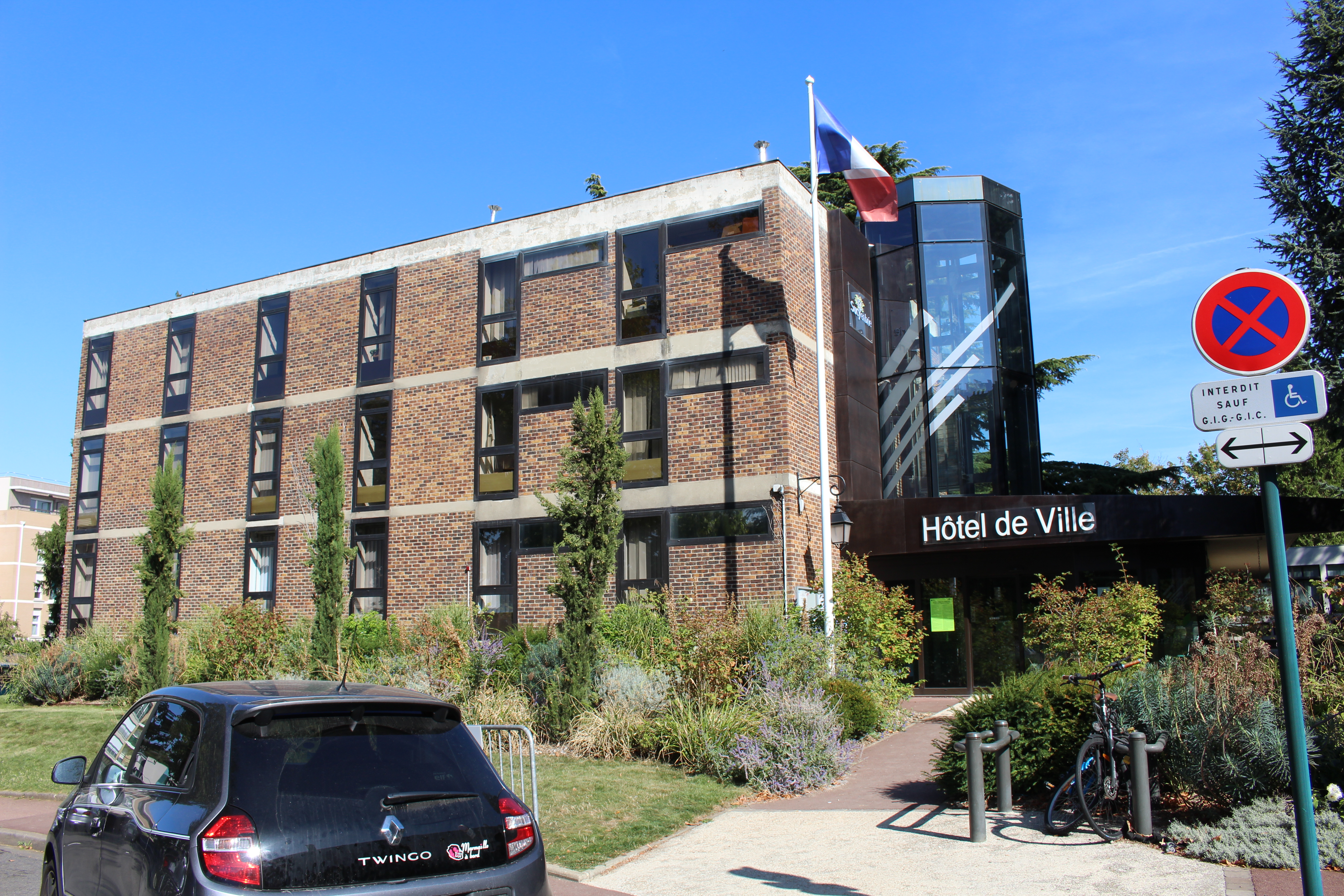
- The reception block at the Hôtel de Ville in September 2019

General information
- Type: City hall
- Architectural style: Modern style
- Location: Sucy-en-Brie, France
- Coordinates: 48.7710°N 2.5238°E
- Completed: 1982

Monument historique
- Official name: Château de Haute-Maison
- Type: Inscrit
- Designated: 1980
- Reference no.: PA00079908

The Hôtel de Ville (French pronunciation: [otɛl də vil], City Hall) is a municipal building in Sucy-en-Brie, Val-de-Marne, in the southeastern suburbs of Paris, standing on Avenue Georges Pompidou. It incorporates the Château de Haute-Maison which was designated a monument historique by the French government in 1980.

== History ==
=== Cour de la Recette ===
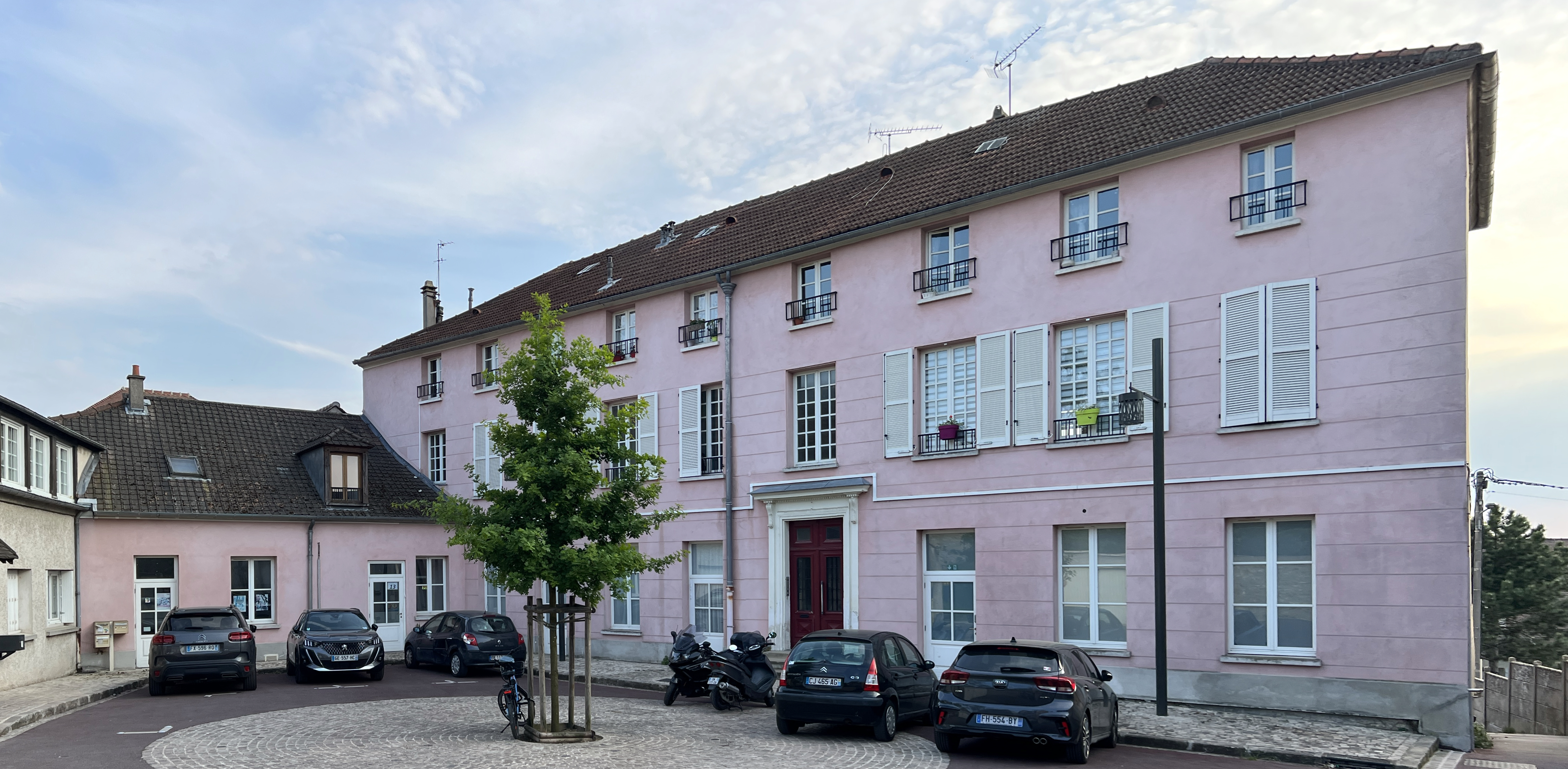
The building at Cour de la Recette

Following the French Revolution, the town council initially met in the house of the mayor at the time. This arrangement continued until 1841 when the council led by the mayor, Gabriel-Raymond Ginoux, acquired a large private house in Cour de la Recette for use as a combined hotel and school. Work to convert the building was completed in 1854. The design involved a main frontage of nine bays facing onto the street. When the school relocated in the late 18th century, the building was adaped for sole use as a town hall. After it was no longer required for municipal use, it served as the local fire station.

=== Château de Montaleau ===
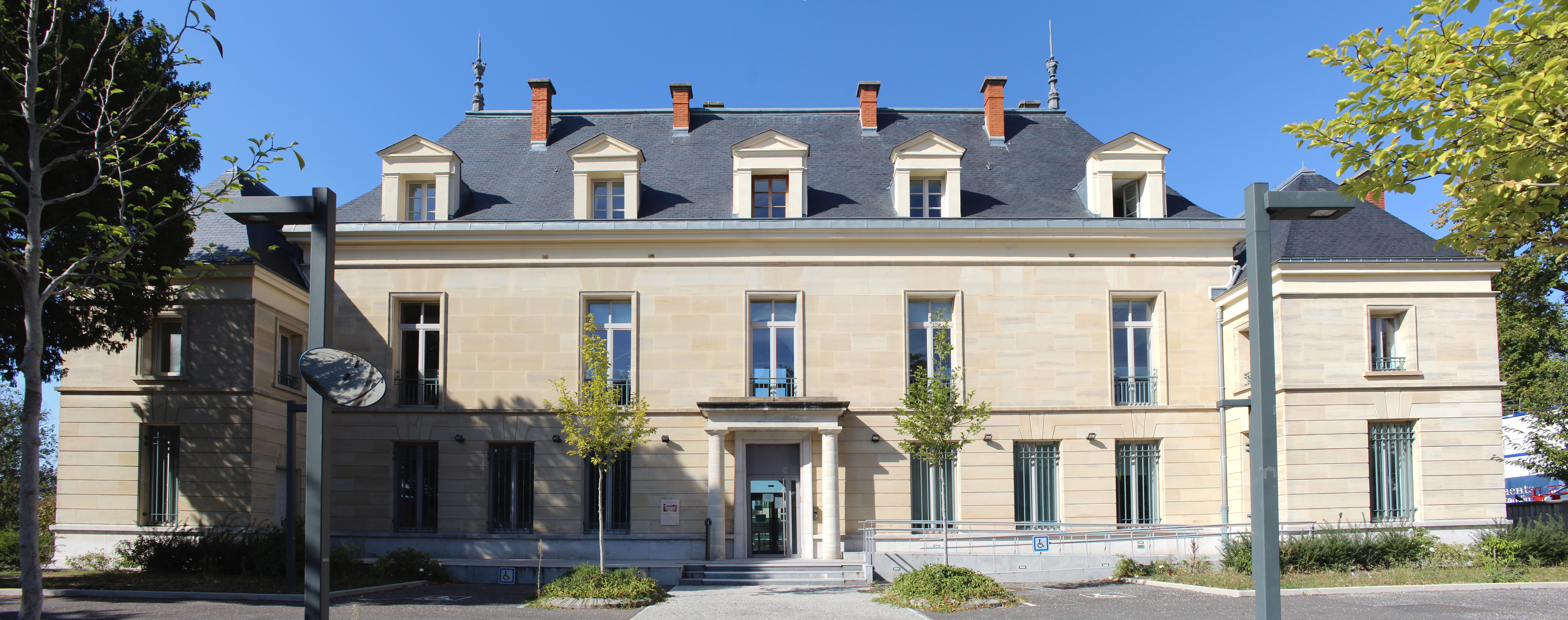
The Château de Montaleau

In the early 1960s, following significant population growth, the council led by the mayor, Albert Pleuvry, decided to relocate to a more substantial municipal building. The building they selected was the Château de Montaleau. The château was commissioned by Philippe de Coulanges (1565–1636) in about 1620. After being inherited by his son, Philippe II de Coulanges (1595–1659), the house became the childhood home of the future letter writer, Marie de Rabutin-Chantal, marquise de Sévigné. In 1655, it was acquired by Marie de Grieu, who was married to Jacques de Lyonne, the Grand Audiencier of France. Later owners included the American naval officer, Commodore Jonas Coe who lived there from 1854 to 1860.

The building was designed in the neoclassical style and built in ashlar stone. The design involved a symmetrical main frontage of seven bays facing onto what is now Rue Pierre Samard, with the end bays projected forward as pavilions. The central bay featured a porch formed by a pair of Doric order columns supporting an entablature. The building was fenestrated by casement windows on the first two floors and by dormer windows at attic level. It was acquired by the council in 1937 but only converted for municipal use in the early 1960s. The council moved into the building in 1962.

After the building was no longer required for municipal use, it served as the Conservatoire de musique and then, from 2015, as the local tribunal d'instance.

=== Château de Haute-Maison ===
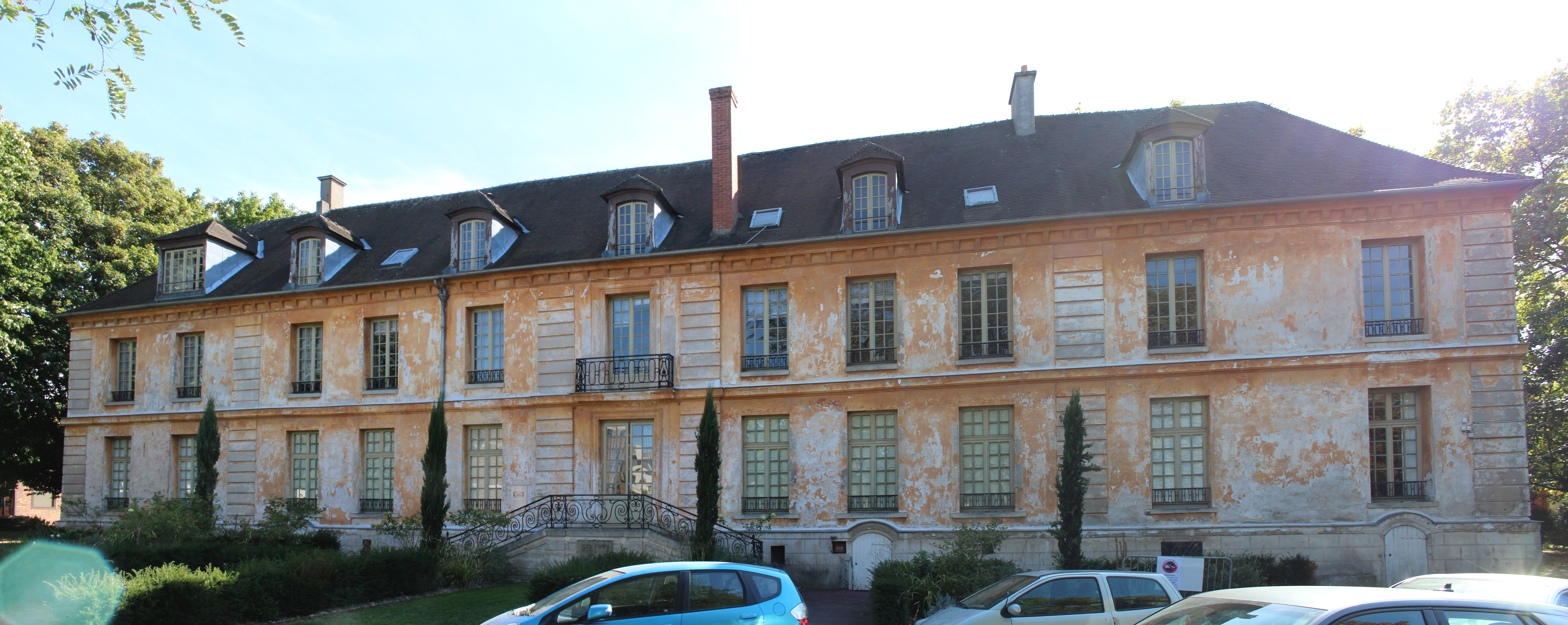
The Château de Haute-Maison

In the mid-1970s, the council had the opportunity to acquire another important historical building, the Château de Haute-Maison. The building was designed in the neoclassical style, built in ashlar stone and dated back at least to 1599. The design involved a near-symmetrical main frontage of 11 bays facing onto what is now Avenue Georges Pompidou. The central bay featured a forestair leading up to a doorway. The rest of the building was fenestrated by casement windows. It was acquired by the playwright, Ludovic Halévy in 1893 and then passed down his family. It was rented out for use as a centre for refugees from Eastern Europe in the mid-20th century.

The building was bought by the council in 1976 and, after being converted for municipal use, it became the town hall in 1979. Internally, the principal room created was the Salle des Mariages (wedding room).

A three-storey reception block, designed in the modern style was constructed in red brick on a site to the west of the original building and was completed in 1982.
