= Poutrocoët =

Poutrocoët was an early medieval pagus in Brittany. The term "Poutrocoët" is Breton, and contemporaries translated it literally into Latin as pagus trans silvam, the "country beyond the forest", as in certain charters in the cartulary of Redon Abbey. (Note: -coët" means woods or forest.)

Poutrocoët was originally a part of the early Breton kingdom of Domnonée, and included a smaller region carrying the name Porhoët. It was much larger than the other pagi, and was perhaps just "a vast region that had escaped the primitive division into pagi". (Note: From Chédeville and Guillotel, page 86, as quoted in Jankulak, page 154: "une vaste région qui avait échappé à la division primitive en pagi") It was sparsely populated and heavily forested, and so is sometimes associated with Brocéliande and the Argoat. By about 1000, Porhoët was a viscounty.

Poutrocoët was also a diocese for a time. Until the 860s the bishops whose seat was Aleth usually titled themselves episcopus in Poutrocoet or episcopus in pago trans silvam, sometimes episcopus in Aleta civitate (bishop in the civitas of Aleth"). In the 860s they began to be styled "Bishops of the see of Saint Malo" (episcopus super episcopatum sancti Machutis).

== Bibliography ==
Chédeville, André; Guillotel, Hubert (1984). La Bretagne des saints et des rois: Ve–Xe siècles. ASIN 2858826137.

Flatrès, Pierre (1971). "Les anciennes structures rurales de Bretagne d'après le cartulaire de Redon: Le paysage rural et son évolution". Études Rurales. 41 (41): 87–93. doi:10.3406/rural.1971.1587. JSTOR 20120086.

Jankulak, Karen (2000). The Medieval Cult of St Petroc. Boydell & Brewer. ISBN 9780851157771.

Smith, Julia M. H. (1990). "Oral and Written: Saints, Miracles, and Relics in Brittany, c. 850–1250". Speculum. 65 (2): 309–343. doi:10.2307/2864295. JSTOR 2864295.
