= Gabriel Cortois de Pressigny =

French Catholic prelate (1745–1823)

Monsignor Gabriel Cortois de Pressigny
- Archbishop of Besançon
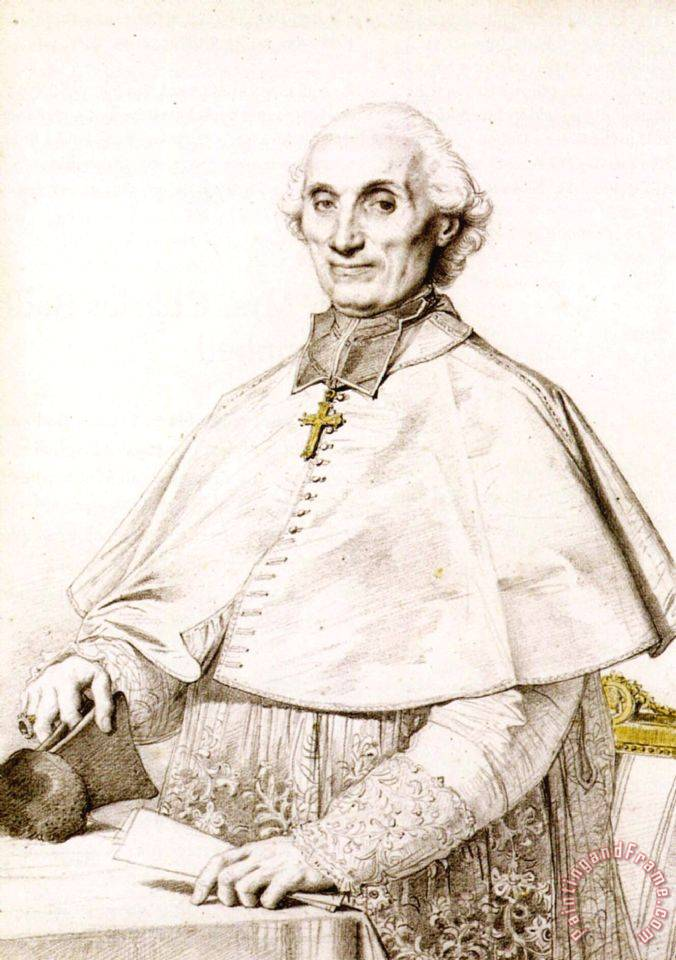
- Portrait by Jean-Auguste-Dominique Ingres, 1816
- Church: Roman Catholic Church
- Archdiocese: Besançon
- Installed: 1 October 1817
- Term ended: 2 May 1823
- Predecessor: Claude Le Coz
- Successor: Paul-Ambroise Frère de Villefrancon
- Other post: Bishop of Ancient Diocese of Saint-Malo (1785–1801)

Orders
- Consecration: 15 January 1786 by César Guillaume de La Luzerne

Personal details
- Born: 11 December 1745 Dijon, Kingdom of France
- Died: 2 May 1823 (aged 77) Paris, Kingdom of France

Ordination history
History
Episcopal consecration
- Principal consecrator: César Guillaume de La Luzerne
- Co-consecrators: Jacques-Joseph-François de Vogüé, Anne-Antoine-Jules de Clermont-Tonnerre
- Date: 15 January 1786
Episcopal succession
Bishops consecrated by Gabriel Cortois de Pressigny as principal consecrator
- Hyacinthe-Louis de Quélen: 28 October 1817
- Paul-Ambroise Frère de Villefrancon: 12 August 1821
- Augustin Louis de Montblanc: 12 August 1821
- Jean-Gaston de Pins: 10 November 1822

Gabriel Cortois de Pressigny (11 December 1745 – 2 May 1823) was a French prelate, Bishop of Saint-Malo and then Archbishop of Besançon.

== Biography ==
Born in Dijon on 11 December 1745, Gabriel Cortois de Pressigny is the son of Claude-Antoine Cortois, coseigneur of Quincey, counselor to the Parliament of Burgundy, and Anne de Mussy. He was the youngest brother of Pierre-Marie-Magdeleine Cortois Balore successively bishop of the former diocese of Alais and Nîmes and the nephew of Gabriel Cortois de Quincey, Bishop of Belley.

Vicar General of Langres, abbot commendatory of Saint-Jacques in the diocese of Béziers, he was prior of the priory of Commagny in Moulins-Engilbert, of which he holds the benefit at the time of the Revolution. He was appointed Bishop of Saint-Malo on 11 December 1785, and consecrated on 15 January 1786, by the bishops of Langres, Dijon and Chalons. He chose as vicar general Jacques-Julien Mesle Grandclos, who was first archdeacon and, since 1782, abbot commendatory of the Abbey of Notre-Dame de la Chaume Machecoul.

On 14 October 1790, he was served the civil constitution of the French clergy and the abolition of his diocese by a decree of the National Assembly. Refusing to take the prescribed oath, he found himself forced into exile, first in Chambéry, then in Switzerland and Bavaria.

Returning to France after the signing of the 1801 Concordat, he played no role under the First Empire. He offered his resignation to the Pope only in 1816, a typical attitude of the survivors of the Ancien Régime episcopate, ultra-royalist and Gallican.

Charged in August 1814 by Louis XVIII with negotiating a new concordat with the Holy See, he was recalled in the spring of 1816, and was named peer of France and then Archbishop of Besançon on 20 September 1817. However he did not officially take possession of his see until 1 November 1819. Often absent from the diocese, he died in Paris on 2 May 1823.
