= Saint-Malo Cathedral =

Cathedral in Saint-Malo

Coordinates: 48°38′58″N 2°1′32″W

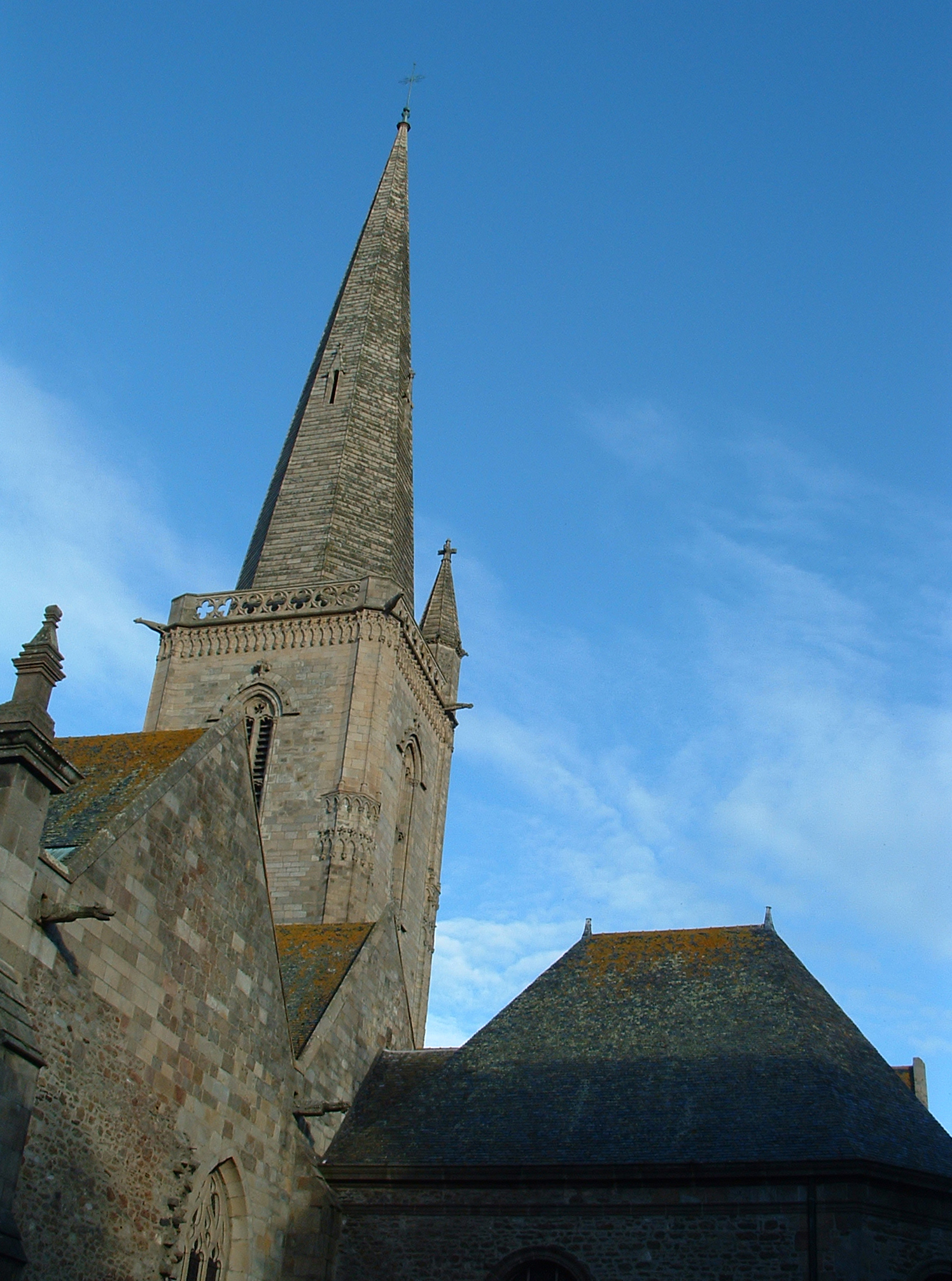

Religion
- Affiliation: Catholic Church
- Status: Active

Location
- Location: Saint-Malo, France
- Interactive map of Saint-Malo Cathedral

Architecture
- Style: Romanesque, Gothic
- Completed: 12th century

Website
- Cathedrale Saint Malo

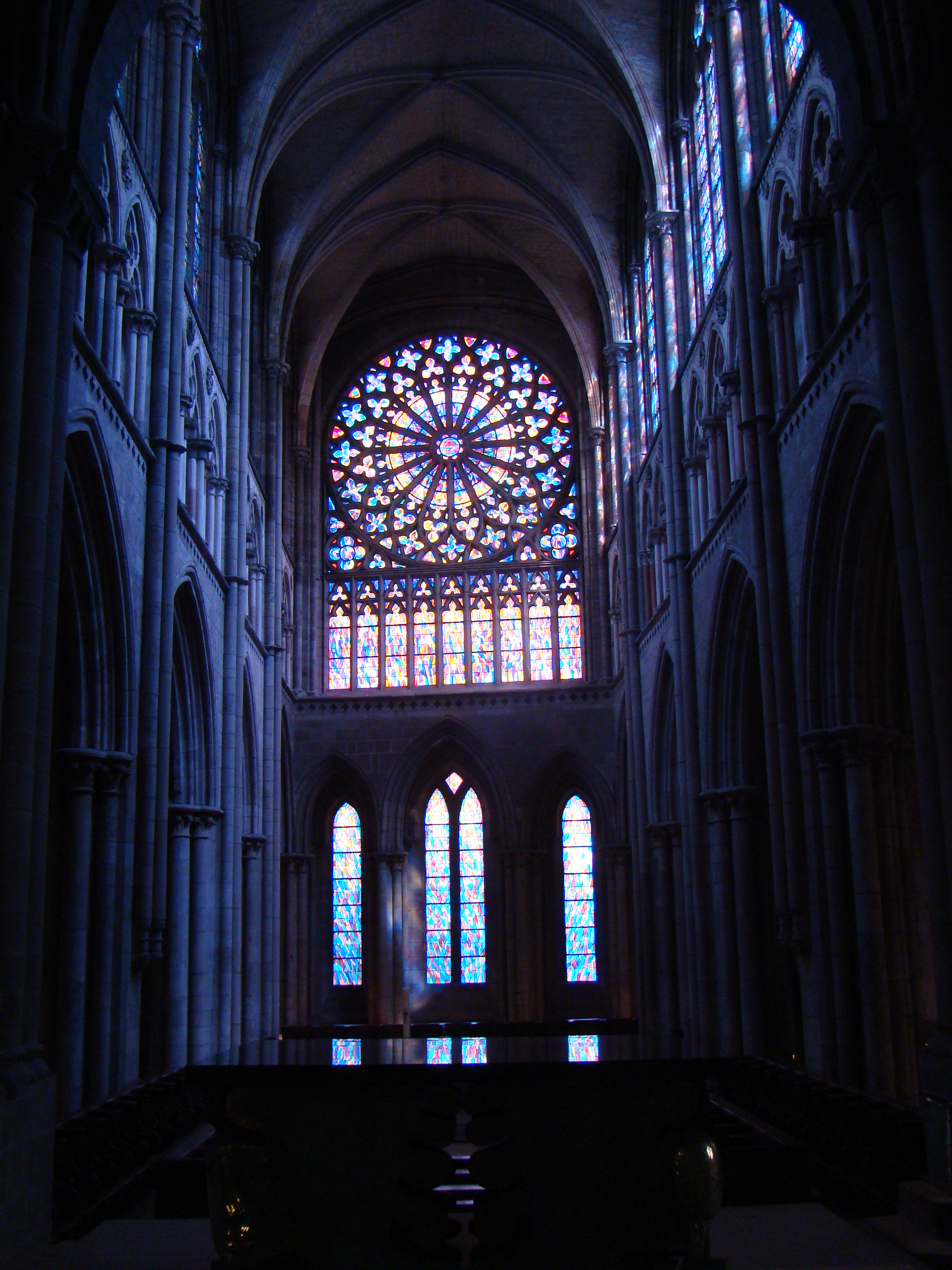
Interior view of Saint-Malo cathedral showing the rose window

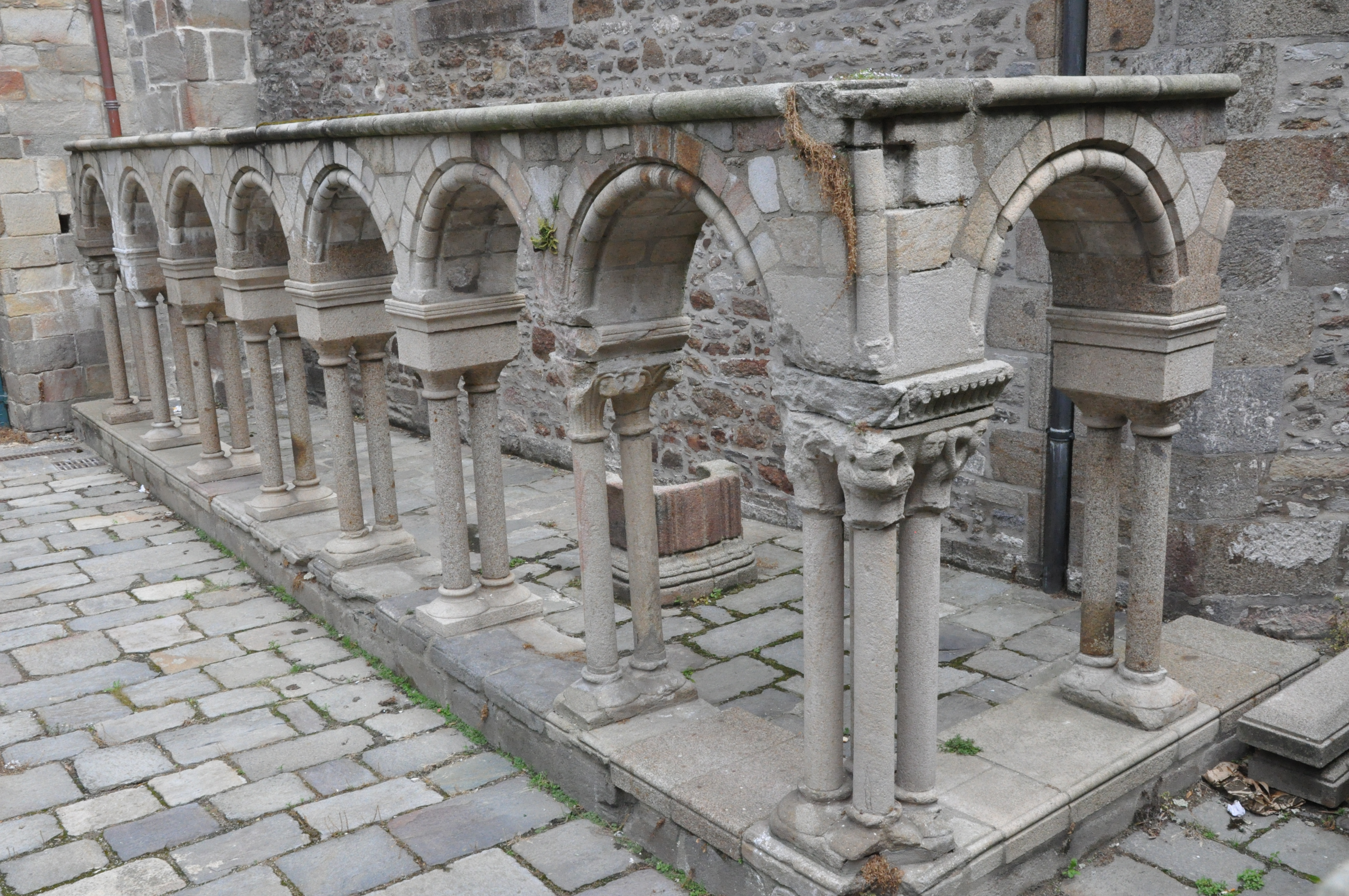
Part of the cloister of the Saint-Vincent cathedral in Saint-Malo

Saint-Malo Cathedral (Cathédrale Saint-Vincent-de-Saragosse de Saint-Malo) is a Catholic Cathedral located in Saint-Malo, Brittany, France. The church was founded in dedication to Saint Vincent of Saragossa and is a national monument of France. It was built in a mix of Romanesque and Gothic styles during the episcopacy of Jean de Châtillon (1146-1163) on the site of an ancient church founded in the 7th century. The cathedral suffered damage during World War II when the steeple toppled onto the Sacred Heart Chapel. An organ which had been built in 1893 by Louis Debierre was destroyed. On 21 May 1972, after 28 years of work, a ceremony was held to celebrate the completion of the restoration. It is a stop on the Tro Breizh, a Catholic pilgrimage that links the towns of the seven founding saints of Brittany.

== History ==
=== Early history ===
Historical records of the rocky outcrop on which Saint-Malo stands show that a hermit called Aaron d'Aleth founded a hermitage there towards the middle of the 6th century. A Welsh monk called Maclow or Mac Law or Malo arrived to the rock and joined Aaron. Malo devoted himself to preaching and in due course became Bishop of Aleth (Saint-Servan). He was succeeded by Saint Gurval who had a church built in honour of his predecessor. This church, burnt by Charlemagne's lieutenants in 811, was rebuilt in 816 by bishop Hélocar and was given the name of the deacon saint Vincent d'Espagne who had been martyred in 304 by Diocletian. In the middle of the 9th century, the Breton king Nominoë nominated Aleth as the location of the episcopacy and called it "Pagus Alethensis".

The Norman invasions of the 10th century left the church in ruins. In 1108, it was gifted to the Benedictine Abbey of Saint-Martin de Marmoutier in Touraine who converted the church into a priory. Jean de Châtillon, the Saint-Malo bishop, retook the church after a long struggle and rebuilt it completely around 1152, making it a cathedral and calling it Saint-Malo. He also transferred the episcopacy from Aleth to Saint-Malo-de-l'Isle (on the "rocher of Aaron"). This action created an episcopal area which included the ancient parish of Saint-Servan. In this period, the ecclesiastical authority dominated the town but by the beginning of the 13th century, the Dukes of Brittany started to plot to retake Saint-Malo Cathedral. In the following centuries, Saint-Malo was to be embroiled in many international and dynastic struggles.

=== Later history ===
Several elements of de Châtillon's 12th-century building remain today including part of the cloisters, the nave, and the transept crossing. The choir was constructed in the 13th century. The construction of the tower started in the 12th century and was finished in 1422. The south side of the cathedral and the three chapels in the choir area date to the 15th century. Between 1583 and 1607, the north side of the cathedral was reconstructed and the north transept enlarged. In the 18th century the south chapel was built and the façade of the cathedral was reconstructed between 1772 and 1773. A door, previously kept in the courtyard of the Hôtel-Dieu in the rue Saint-Sauveur, was brought to the cathedral in the early 17th century and a portal from the Chapelle Sainte-Anne-des-Ursulines was placed in the south-west of the cathedral.

The cathedral was the ancient bishopric of Saint Malo from the year 1146 until 1801 when the Concordat of 1801 abolished that bishopric and divided its territory between the Rennes, Saint-Brieuc, and Vannes bishoprics. In 1146, Jean de Châtillon, who had been the bishop of Aleth since 1144, transferred his bishopric to Saint-Malo which was considered more secure a base than Aleth. In 1146, Pope Eugène III agreed to the transfer. The monastery of Saint Malo, founded in 1108, became de Châtillon's official residence and the monastery became a cathedral replacing the previous cathedral of Saint-Pierre at Aleth. Thus, the cathédrale de Saint-Malo was born. Jean de Châtillon was also known as "Jean de la Grille" as when he was buried in the cathedral his tomb needed a grill installed to ward off his many fervent admirers.

== Interior ==
=== Architecture ===
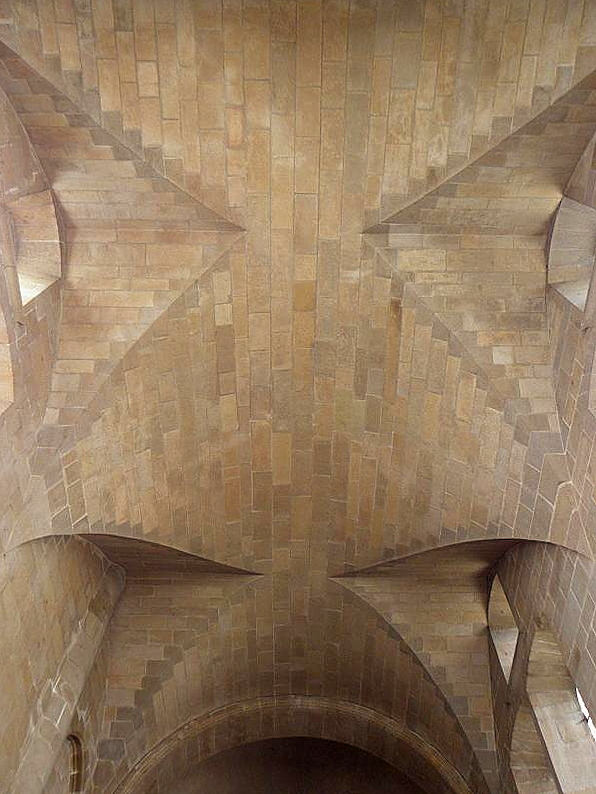
The vaulting in the north transept

Saint-Malo Cathedral is built on a Latin cross plan. The choir and south aisle are covered by ogival vaulting in the Gothic style, while the north aisle uses groin vaulting. The ceiling of the south chapel is covered with modern paneling.

Several additions to the cathedral date from between the fifteenth and seventeenth centuries. The south side of the building includes the Saint Julien wing, built between 1461 and 1486. The north façade includes the Saint-Côme wing, designed by architect Thomas Poussin and built between 1593 and 1607. The Saint Julien wing also includes an entrance known as the Porte de Velours, added in 1851.

The arms of the transept date to 1623 and contain four windows. Several of the stone capitals supporting the nave and transept crossing date to the twelfth century. These capitals are carved with grotesque figures and biblical scenes and are difficult to see from the ground because of their height.

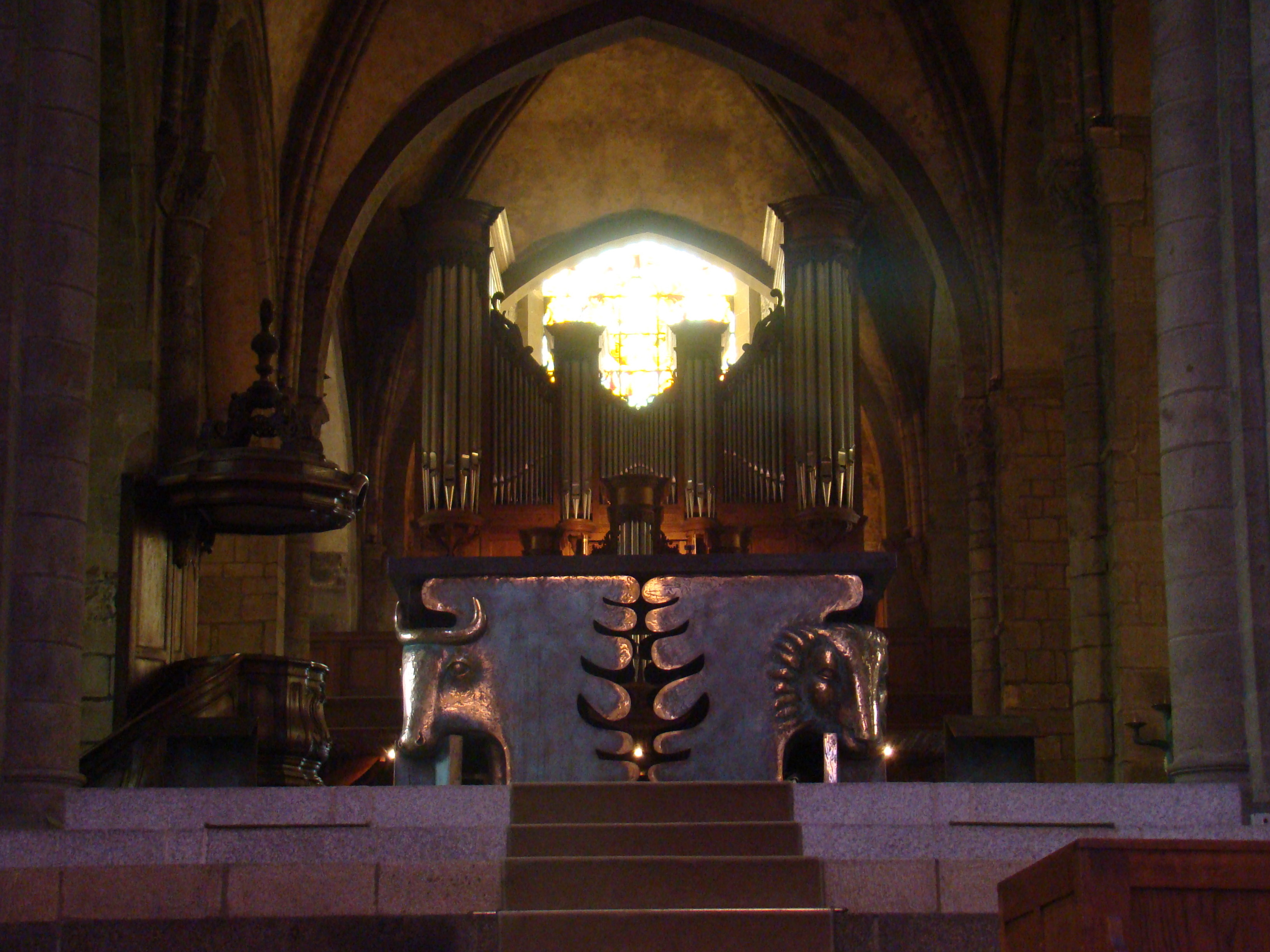
The bronze high altar

=== The main altar ===
The bronze high altar in the cathedral was consecrated on 8 December 1991 and was the work of the painter Arcabas and Étienne Pirot. The theme of the altar is the tetramorph or the four Evangelists appearing in animal form. The four Evangelists are winged; the wing is an ancient symbol of divinity with each representing the virtues required for Christian salvation. The lion of St Mark represents courage, resurrection, and royalty. The ox is an ancient Christian symbol of redemption and life through sacrifice and signifies Luke’s records of Christ as a priest and his ultimate sacrifice for the future of humanity. The eagle of John represents the sky, heavens, and the human spirit. Matthew's emblem is a man. These four symbols first appear in the Book of Ezekiel as the four animals pulling the chariot of Ezekiel's vision (Ezekiel 1. 1-14) and later in St John's Apocalypse (Apoc 4; 7-8), later being adopted by the Church as the emblems of the four Evangelists.

=== Furnishings ===
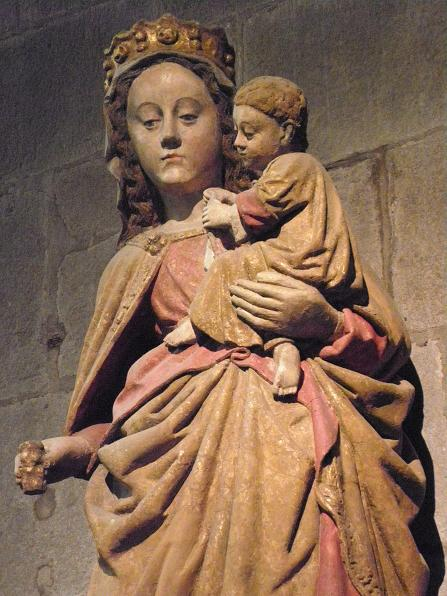
The sculpture of Notre-Dame de la Grand'Porte in Saint Malo's Saint Vincent cathedral

Saint-Malo Cathedral contains liturgical furnishings, funerary monuments, reliquaries, and devotional sculptures dating from the twelfth to the nineteenth centuries. In the south nave stands an eighteenth-century wooden pulpit that survived the 1944 bombing of the cathedral. The choir stalls also date to the eighteenth century. Other furnishings include a twelfth-century baptismal font, a nineteenth-century baldaquin, and the furnishings of the high altar, which include desks, an armchair, two stools, a carved stoup for holy water, and a candlestick. A Stations of the Cross by French artist Henri Chaumont is also housed in the cathedral.

Several tombs and reliquaries are located throughout the interior. Overlooking the ambulatory is a twelfth-century stone sarcophagus containing the relics of bishop Jean de Châtillon, the first bishop of Saint-Malo. At the base of the chevet is a reliquary chest containing relics associated with Saint Célestin, a Christian martyr traditionally associated with the second century. The chest was given by Pope Pius VII to Monseigneur Courtois de Pressigny, the last bishop of Saint-Malo. The cathedral also contains thirteenth- and fifteenth-century gisants, carved tomb sculptures depicting the dead in repose, as well as a reliquary containing the skull of French explorer Jacques Cartier in a neighbouring chapel.

The cathedral also contains several devotional sculptures. Statues of La Foi, Saint Maur, and Saint Benoit were created in 1743 by the Genoese sculptor Francesco Maria Schiaffino. They originally stood in a Benedictine church that was later converted into the Saint-Malo Palais de Justice.

One of the cathedral's best-known devotional objects is the fifteenth-century marble statue Notre-Dame de la Grand'Porte. Also known as the "Miraculeuse Protectrice de la Cité Malouine", the statue has long been associated with local legends and miracles and is widely venerated in Saint-Malo. For centuries it stood in a niche above one of the entrances in the city's defensive walls. In 2003, the statue was restored and moved inside the cathedral near the sacristy entrance to protect it from weathering. A copy remains in the original wall niche.

=== Organ ===
The pipe organ was built in 1977 by Koenig and inaugurated in 1980. It is composed of four keyboards, one pedal, and 35 stops. This organ replaced an older one built in 1893 by the Nantes born Louis Debierre in the romantic style, which was destroyed in 1944. A new choir organ of two keyboards, one pedal, and 18 stops built by Koenig was added in 2014.

=== Stained glass ===
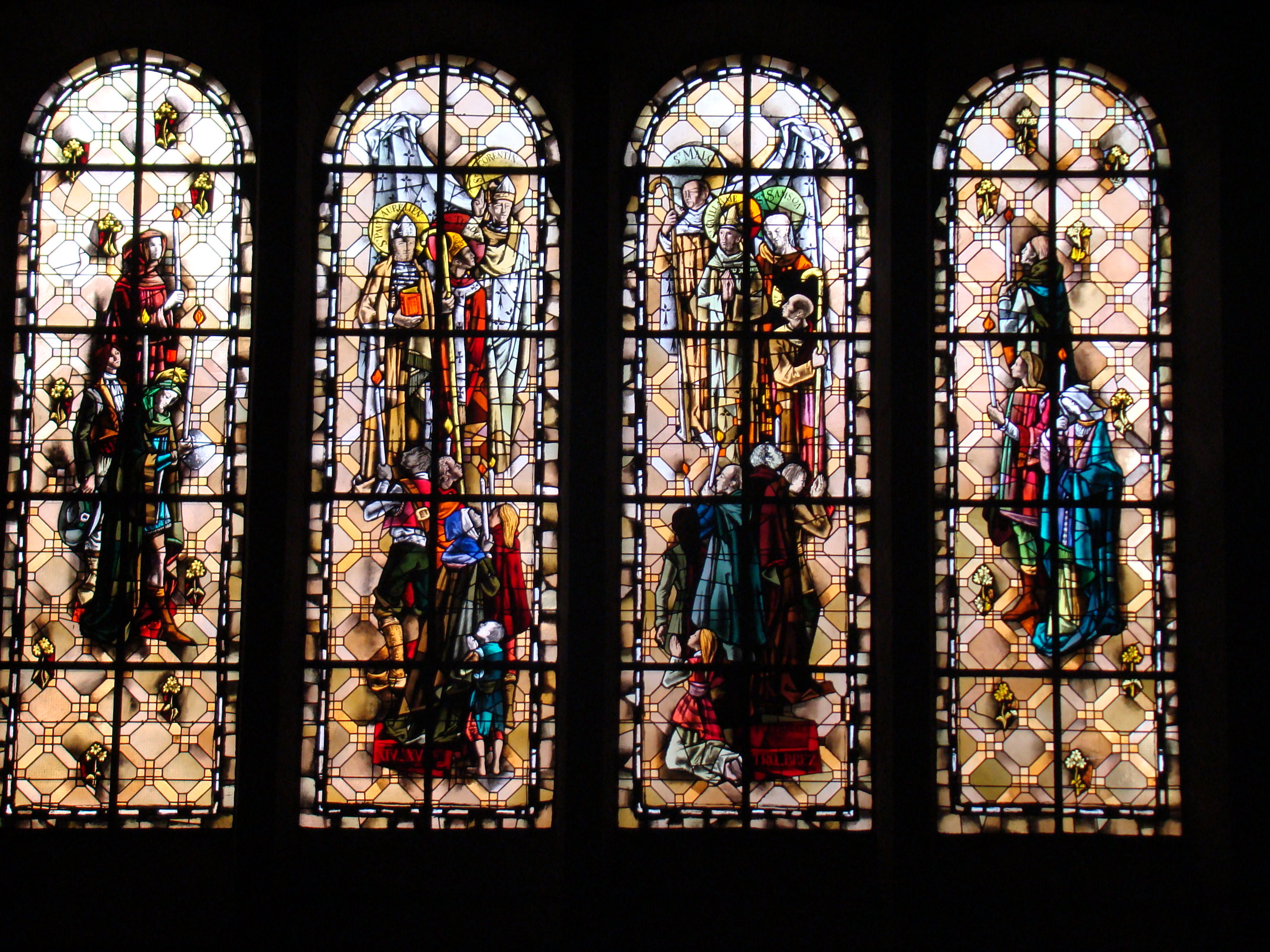
Some of the great Breton saints: Paul Aurélien, Tugdual, Corentin, Malo, Guillaume, Samson and Patern

The stained glass windows of Saint-Malo Cathedral depict scenes from the history of the city, the cathedral, and the saints associated with Brittany. Many of the nave windows were created by French glass artist Max Ingrand.

On the south side of the nave, one window depicts the arrival of the Welsh monk and saint Malo at the hermitage of Aaron around 560. A small chapel known as La Chapelle Saint-Aaron marks the site of the hermitage. Another window shows French explorer Jacques Cartier receiving a blessing from the bishop before departing on his 1535 voyage to Canada.

The north side of the nave contains three windows. One depicts the martyrdom of Vincent of Saragossa, the cathedral's patron saint, in 304. Another commemorates the foundation of the See of Saint-Malo by bishop Jean de Châtillon in 1152. A third depicts the Tro Breizh, a traditional Breton pilgrimage to the relics of the seven founding saints of the Breton bishoprics. Above the main entrance, partly hidden by the organ, a stained glass window depicts the Assumption of the Virgin.

The Great Rose window was designed in 1968 by architect Raymond Cornon. It replaced an earlier rose window destroyed in 1693 during an English attack on the cathedral. A 1970 stained glass window on the north side of the building, created by artists Jean Gouremelin and Michel Durand, depicts the Breton saints Paul Aurélien, Tugdual, Corentin, Malo, Guillaume, Samson, and Patern. Other stained glass windows in the choir, chevet, ambulatory, and transept were created by artists Jean Le Moal and Bernard Allain.

== Burials ==
=== Jacques Cartier ===
The cathedral holds the tomb of the French explorer Jacques Cartier who was born in St Malo on 31 December 1491 and died there on 1 September 1557. The tomb is in a chapel off the ambulatory and north of the choir. In 1949, the original grave was, during the course of excavations, discovered and moved to its present location.

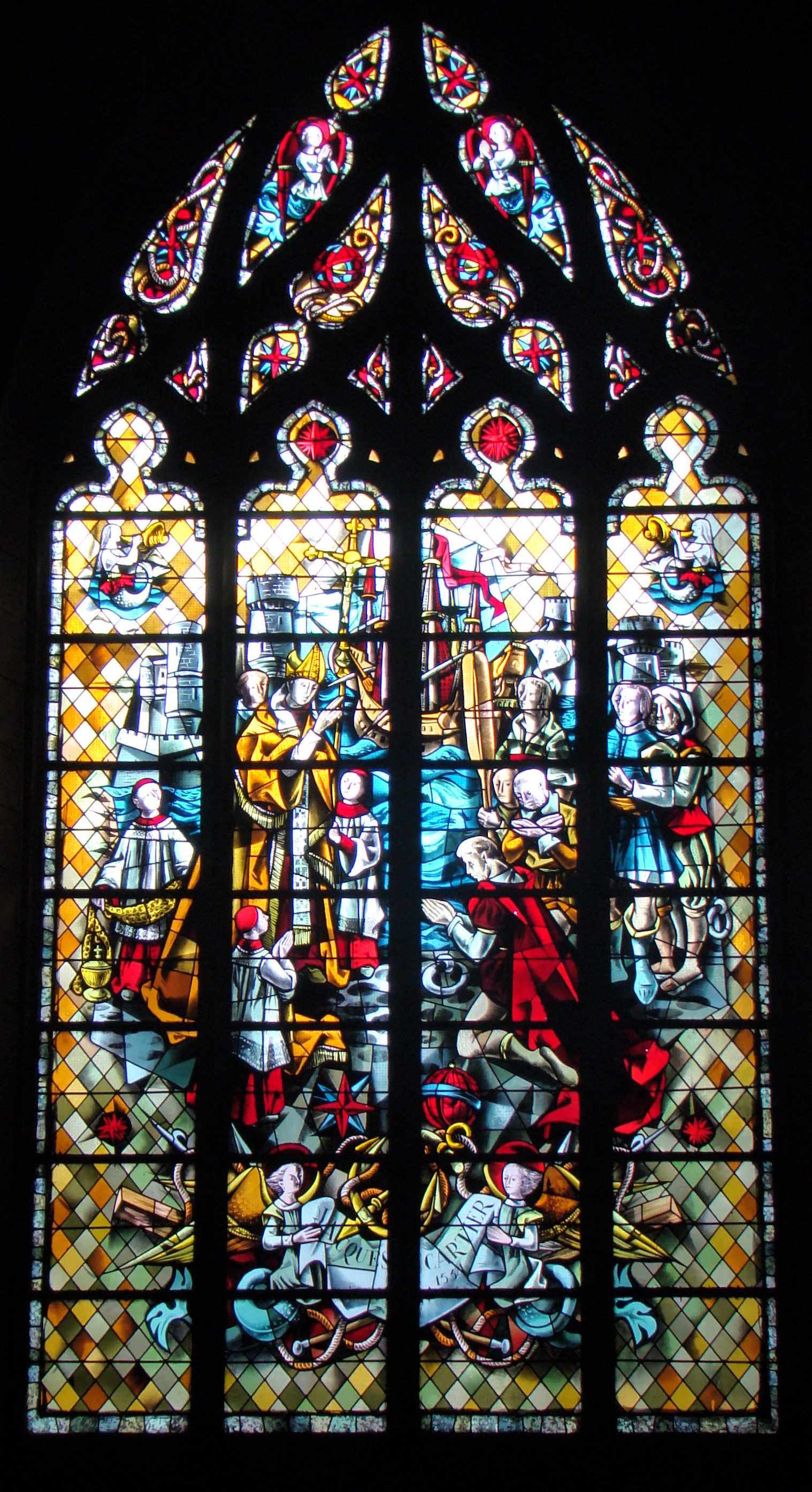
Max Ingrand's stained glass window depicting Monseigneur Denis Briçonnet, bishop of Saint-Malo from 1513 to 1535, blessing Jacques Cartier before his voyage which led to the discovery of Canada

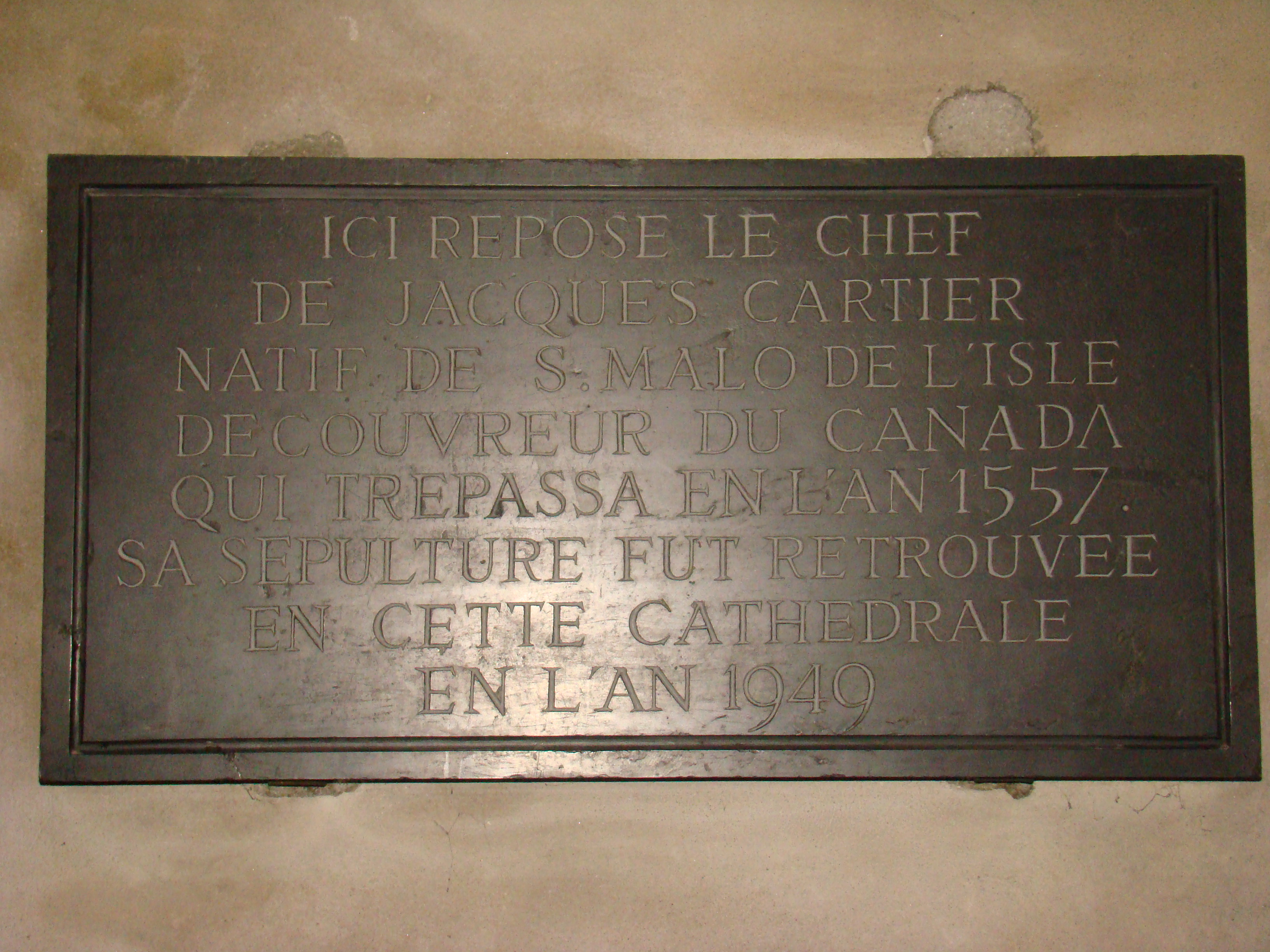
Plaque in Cathedral. The text in English: "Here rests the skull of Jacques Cartier, born at Saint-Malo, the discoverer of Canada, who passed away in 1557. His grave was recovered in this cathedral in the year 1949."

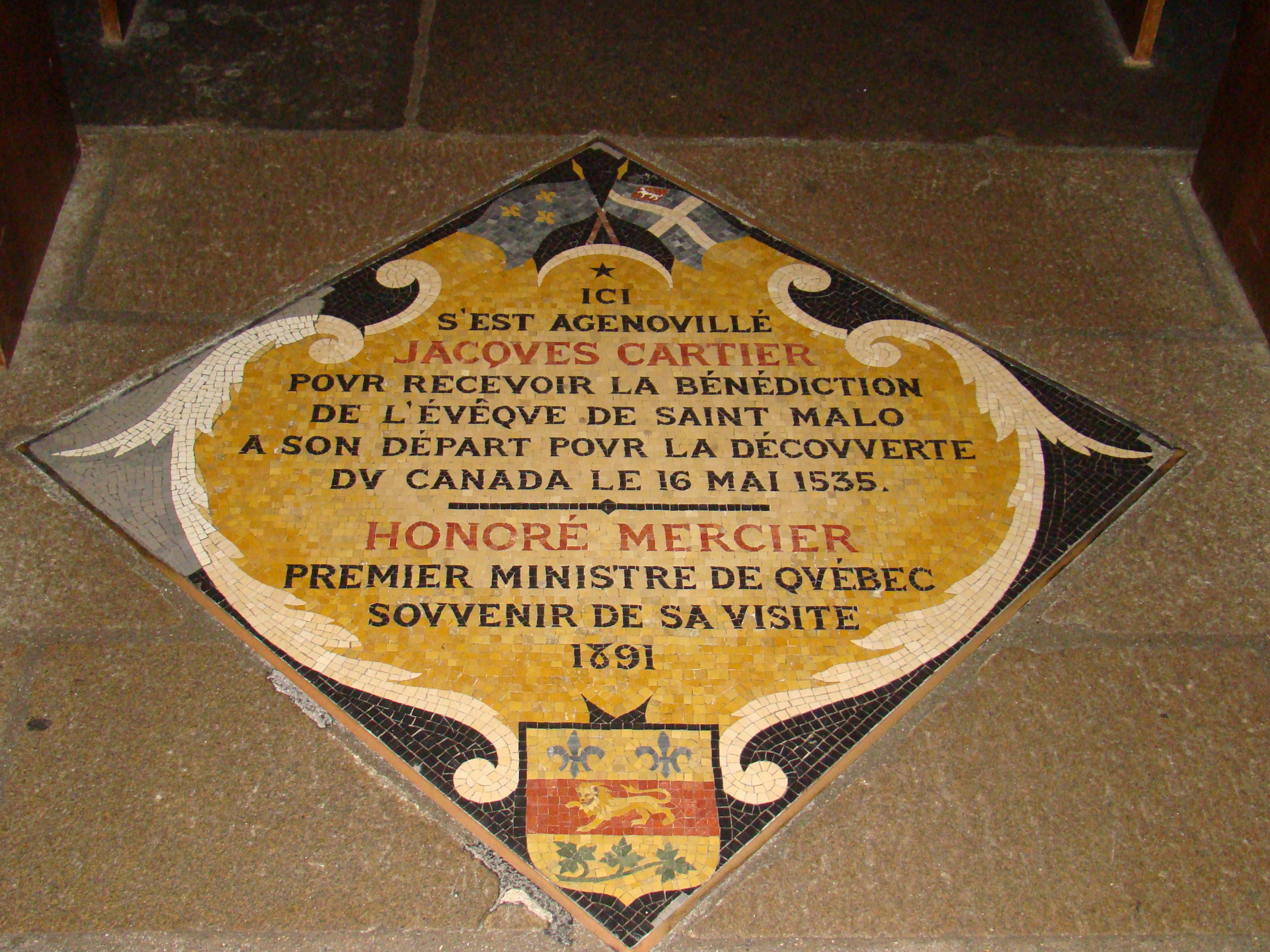
Plaque marking the spot where Jacques Cartier knelt to receive the blessing of the bishop of Saint Malo before his voyage to Canada in 1535. The plaque records that Honoré Mercier, the Premier of Quebec, visited the cathedral in 1891.

=== René Duguay-Trouin ===
Privateer and St. Malo native René Duquay-Trouin was initially buried in the Saint-Roch church in Paris but his remains were moved to Saint-Malo on the three hundred year anniversary of his birth.

== Tower ==
In 1422, rebuilding of the tower was started using the foundations of the earlier tower. In August 1858, Napoleon III and Empress Eugénie were passing through Saint-Malo and were persuaded by Abbé Jean-François Huchet to finance the addition of an arrow to the tower spire which would be visible from the sea. There is a statue of Abbé Jean-François Huchet in the cathedral by Jean-Marie Valentin that statue stands on the south side of the ambulatory.

The tower was completely destroyed during the 1944 bombing but replaced in 1972. The new tower's design was based on a Norman church in Périers. The tower has four bells:

- "Jean de Châtillon" which chimes the note "re". The bell weighs 1.500 kg and was blessed on 16 September 1894,
- "Jacques Cartier" which chimes the note "do". The bell weighs 2.550 kg and was blessed on16 September 1894,
- "Noguette" which chimes the note "si". The bell weighs 1750 kg. It was recast and blessed on 12 November 1989,
- "Gros Malo" which chimes the note "si-flat". The bell weighs 3.500 kg. It was recast and blessed on 17 July 1994

== The 1944 bombing ==
The city of Saint Malo suffered much bombing and artillery fire by both Germans and Americans during fighting in early August 1944. Shells fired from a German minesweeper on 6 August decapitated the cathedral steeple which toppled onto the Sacred Heart Chapel causing huge damage. One of the casualties was an old organ which had been built in 1893 by Louis Debierre. On 21 May 1972, after twenty-eight years of work, a ceremony was held to celebrate the completion of the cathedral's restoration which had been masterminded by Raymond Cornon and Pierre Prunet, the then official architects for historic monuments. Cornon also worked on reconstructions in Fougères, Rennes, Quimper, Vannes, Nantes and Vitré.

== Old Cathedral of Saint-Pierre at Aleth ==
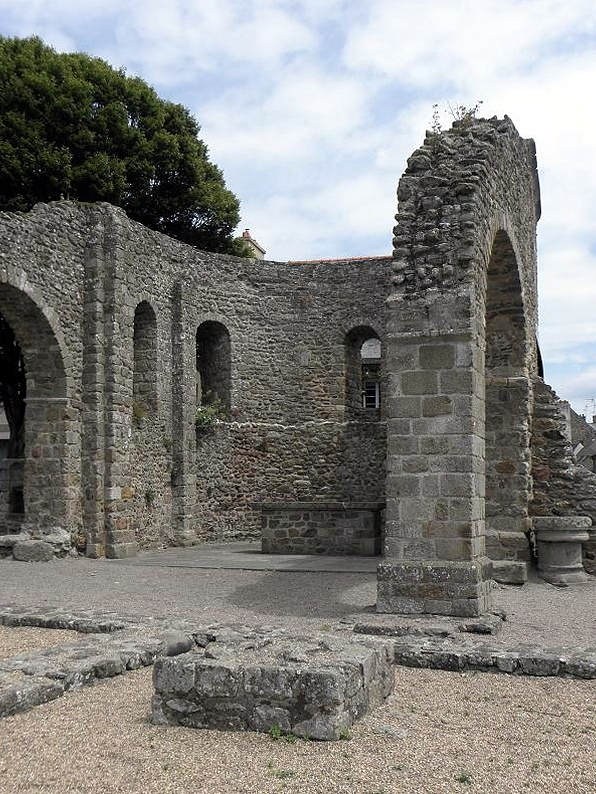
Ruins of Saint-Servan Cathédrale Saint-Pierre d'Aleth

All that is left of the original cathedral at Aleth are ruins as seen in the photograph shown here. When in 1144 the bishopric was transferred to Saint Malo, Aleth put itself under the protection of Saint-Servan.

== See also ==
- Église Saint-Patern de Vannes
- Quimper Cathedral
- Dol Cathedral
- Saint-Brieuc Cathedral
- Tréguier Cathedral
- Saint-Pol-de-Léon's Cathedral of Saint Paul Aurélien
- the Notre-Dame du Kreisker Chapel and Chapelle Saint-Pierre and cemetery

== Sources ==
- Organs in France: brief history of cathedral
- Catholic Hierarchy: Diocese of Saint-Malo
