= Ancient Diocese of Saint-Malo =

Roman Catholic diocese in France/(c. 7th century – 1801)

Coordinates: 48.65°N 2.03°W

Diocese of Saint-Malo Dioecesis Maclovensis
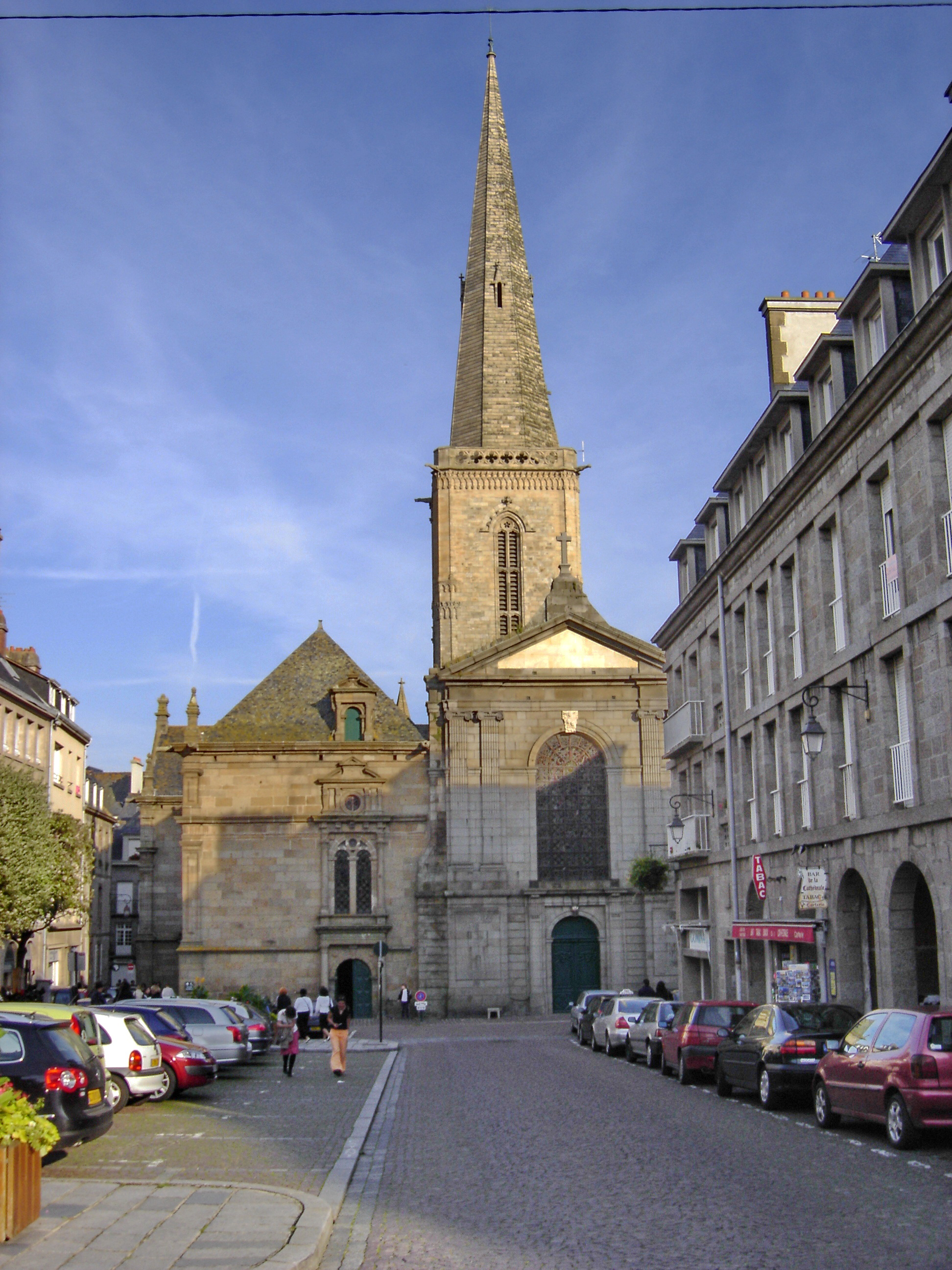
- Saint-Malo Cathedral

Location
- Country: France
- Ecclesiastical province: Tours

Information
- Denomination: Catholic
- Rite: Roman
- Dissolved: 1790 / 1801
- Language: Latin

Map

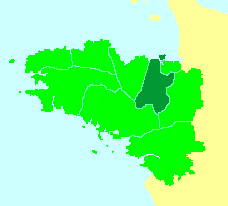
The former diocese of Saint-Malo

The former Breton and French Catholic Diocese of Saint-Malo (Latin: Dioecesis Alethensis, then Dioecesis Macloviensis) existed from at least the 7th century until the French Revolution. Its seat was at Aleth until the 12th century, when it was moved to Saint-Malo. Its territory extended over some of the modern departments of Ille-et-Vilaine, Côtes-d'Armor, and Morbihan. Until the 860s, it was sometimes termed the bishopric in (the monastery of) Poutrocoet.

== History ==
In early Brittany, church organization was not centered on cities and dioceses, since the Roman system of government had not reached so far to the west and north, but on monasteries, populated from the British Isles and Ireland. Dol, Treguier, and Aleth were considered monastery-bishoprics until the 11th century.

Already by the mid-6th century the metropolitan bishop of Tours was struggling to exert his authority over the bishops of Brittany. At the Council of Tours in 567, which was attended by no bishop of Brittany, a canon forbade the consecration of any bishop of Armorica without the consent of the metropolitan.

In 826, after two generations of warfare between Franks and Bretons, Brittany was conquered, and created a duchy by the Franks. Louis the Pious made the Breton Nominoe the first duke. But when the Emperor Louis died in 840, Nominoe embarked on an independence campaign for Brittany, while posing as a loyal adherent of the distant Emperor Lothair. His plan included ridding himself of bishops who had supported the Gallicising of the Breton church. Simony was a convenient charge.

Bishop Rethwalatrus is referred to as Redhuualatro episcopo in Poutrocoet in a document of 863, in the cartulary of Redon, and again in 858.

Incursions of the Normans into Brittany began in 843 with the sack of Nantes, repeated in 853 and 866. Treguier and Dol and the whole north coast were ravaged between 878 and 882. The Landévennec Abbey was destroyed in 913. In 919, there was general devastation throughout Brittany, causing nobles and monks, with their treasures, to flee the country. The abbey of Redon was destroyed. By 936, the Normans were masters of all Brittany.

In 965, Bishop Salvator, along with Abbot Juanus of Saint-Malo, was forced to flee to Paris from the Normans. He died there, perhaps around 1000.

At a synod held by Pope Leo IX in Reims in October 1049, several clergy of Tours laid a complaint through the archbishop of Reims before the assembly. The bishop of Dol and seven of his suffragans had attempted to secede from the metropolitanate of Tours, and form their own ecclesiastical province, with the bishop of Dol as archbishop and metropolitan, all without papal authority and contrary to custom. Pope Leo ordered the bishop to appear next year at the Roman synod to answer the charges. On 1 September 1050, he wrote to the duke and count of Brittany, informing them that, in accordance with previous papal decisions, all their bishops were subject to the archbishop of Tours, and that in no way could he approve the demand for a separate ecclesiastical province. He had excommunicated all the bishops, not only for their presumption, and their failure to appear at the Roman synod, but for their involvement in simony as well. They were not to carry out ecclesiastical functions or impart blessings.

=== Saint-Malo ===
The town of Saint-Malo lies at the mouth of the Rance River, on the east (right) bank. It was originally an island in the estuary, similar in situation to Mont Saint-Michel.

Eventually, Saint-Malo became the seat of the bishop, though it is still in a monastery. In 1062, Bishop Rainaldus signed himself episcopus de Masloo de Bidainono The cathedral of Saint-Vincent dates from the 12th to 14th century.

The cathedral was staffed by a corporation called the Chapter, led by four dignities (the Dean, the Archdeacon of Dinan, the Archdeacon of Pohorët, and the Cantor) and twenty-three canons. Before the transfer of the diocese to Saint-Malo, the canons were Canons Regular of Saint-Victor de Paris. In 1319, however, they were secularized by order of Pope John XXII. The canons were not subject to episcopal jurisdiction, but depended directly upon the Holy See (Papacy).

Bishop Pierre Benoît (1349–1359) held a diocesan synod in 1349. Bishop Guillaume Poulart (1359–1374) attended the provincial council of Tours in March 1365, which met at Angers, under the presidency of Archbishop Simon. Bishop Robert de la Motte (1389–1423) held diocesan synods in 1402 and 1406. Bishop Pierre Piédru (1434–1449) attended the provincial council of Tours, held in Angers in 1448. Bishop Jean L'Espervier (1450–1486) presided over a diocesan synod in 1452.

==== Concordat of Bologna ====
In 1516, following the papal loss of the Battle of Marignano, Pope Leo X signed a concordat with King Francis I of France, removing the rights of all French entities which held the right to elect to a benefice, including bishoprics, canonicates, and abbeys, and granting the kings of France the right to nominate candidates to all these benefices, provided they be suitable persons, and subject to confirmation of the nomination by the pope. This removed the right of cathedral chapters to elect their bishop, or even to request the pope to name a bishop. The Concordat of Bologna was strongly protested by the University of Paris and by the Parliament of Paris.

==== Seminary ====
Bishop Achille de Harlay de Sancy (1631–1644) was interested in improving the quality of his clergy, and this of necessity involved creating a seminary. He invited Father Vincent de Paul, the co-founder and superior of the Congregation of the Mission to visit his diocese and consider the possibilities in Saint-Malo. The bishop was also abbot commendatory of the abbey of Saint-Meen (Mevennius), for which he had obtained the necessary permissions to convert into a seminary from King Louis XIV, and from the reluctant but eventually compliant Benedictines. De Paul was agreeable, and in 1645 his priests, called colloquially Lazarists, opened the institution, which they staffed down until the abolition of religious orders by the French Revolution in 1791.

In 1739, the city of Saint-Malo had a population of c. 7,000 persons. The diocese had 162 parishes.

=== French Revolution ===
One of the first acts of the French Revolution was the abolition of feudalism and its institutions, including estates, provinces, duchies, baillies, and other obsolete organs of government.

Even before it directed its attention to the Church directly, the National Constituent Assembly attacked the institution of monasticism. On 13 February 1790, it issued a decree which stated that the government would no longer recognize solemn religious vows taken by either men or women. In consequence, Orders and Congregations which lived under a Rule were suppressed in France. Members of either sex were free to leave their monasteries or convents if they wished, and could claim an appropriate pension by applying to the local municipal authority. These decrees applied to the five monasteries of men in the diocese of Saint-Malo: St.-Meen, Montfort, St. Jean des Prés, Beaulieu, and Painpont. Also suppressed were the two monasteries of women.

The Assembly ordered the replacement of political subdivisions of the ancien régime with subdeivisions called "departments", to be characterized by a single administrative city in the center of a compact area. The decree was passed on 22 December 1789, the boundaries fixed on 26 February 1790, with the institution to be effective on 4 March 1790. Saint-Malo was assigned to the Departement d' Ille-et-Vilaine, with its administrative center at Rennes. The National Constituent Assembly then, on 6 February 1790, instructed its ecclesiastical committee to prepare a plan for the reorganization of the clergy. At the end of May, its work was presented as a draft Civil Constitution of the Clergy, which, after vigorous debate, was approved on 12 July 1790. There was to be one diocese in each department, requiring the suppression of approximately fifty dioceses. Saint-Malo was an obvious target, given the relatively small population. The suppression of dioceses by the state was uncanonical.

In the Civil Constitution of the Clergy, the National Constituent Assembly also abolished cathedral chapters, canonicates, prebends, chapters and dignities of collegiate churches, chapters of both secular and regular clergy of both sexes, and abbeys and priories whether existing under a Rule or in commendam.

Bishop Gabriel Cortois de Pressigny resigned as bishop of Saint-Malo in 1801, at the request of Pope Pius VII.

==== Suppression ====
In 1801, when Pope Pius VII restored the hierarchy in France, the diocese of Saint-Malo was not restored. Its territory was distributed among the dioceses of Rennes, Vannes, and Saint-Brieuc.

== Bishops of Aleth ==
P. B. Gams points out that all names before 817 are at least doubtful.

- Aaron
- Suliac
- Saint Malo or Maclovius (487–565)
- Gurval
- Colfin oder Colaphin
- Armael oder Armel
- Enogat
- Maëlmon, ca. 650
- Godefroi or Geofroi c. 656
- Oedmal
- Hamon I.
- Noedi
- Ritwal
- Tutamen
- Ravili
- Bili I.
- Meen or Moene
- Ebon or Edon
- Guibon or Guibert
- Hamon II.
- Walter
- Cadocanan
- Rivallon I.
- Judicaël I.
- Réginald or Regimond
- Menfenic
- Budic or Benedikt
- Docmaël or Idomaël
- Johannes
- Walter
- Hélogard or Haelocar (811–816)
- Ermorus or Ermor (833–834)
- Iarnwaltus or Jarnuvalt (835–837)
- Main, Maen or Mahen (840–846)
- ? Salocon (c. 848)
- Rethwalatrus or Retuvalart (857–867)
- Ratvomo or Ratwili (867–872)
- Bilius
- Salvator (tenth century)
- Raoul (c. 990–1008)

...

- Hamon (III) (c. 1028)

Sede vacante in Aleth

- Martin (c. 1054)

...

- Renaud or Rainaud (c. 1062)

...

- Daniel (I) (c. 1085)
- Benedict (II.) (c. 1092–1111)
- Judicaël (II) (1089–1111)
- Rivallon (II) (1112–1118)
- Daniel (II) (c. 1120)
- Donoald (1120–1143)

== Bishops of Saint-Malo ==
=== 1146–1400 ===
- Jean de Châtillon (1146–1163)
- Albert or Aubert (1163–1184)
- Pierre Giraud or Géraud (1184–1218)
- Radulfus (1219–1230)
- Geoffroi de Pontual 1231–1255
- Nicolas de Flac (1254–1262)

[Phillipe de Bouchalampe, O.Cist. (1263)]

- Simon de Cliçon or Clisson (1264–1286)
- Robert du Pont (1287–1310)
- Raoul Rousselet (1310–1317)
- Alain Gonthier (1318–1333)
- Yves le Prévôt de Bois Boëssel 1333–1348
- Guillaume Mahé (1348–1349)
- Pierre Benoît or de Guémené 1349–1359
- Guillaume Poulart (1359–1374)
- Josselin de Rohan (1375–1389)
- Robert de la Motte d'Acigné (1389–1423)

=== 1423–1827 ===
- Guillaume de Montfort (1423–1432)
- Amaury de la Motte d'Acigné (1432–1434)
- Pierre Piédru (1434–1449)
- Jacques d'Espinay-Durestal (1450)
- Jean L'Espervier (1450–1486)
- Pierre de Montfort de Laval (1486–1493)
- Guillaume Briçonnet 1493–1513
- Denis Briçonnet (1513–1535)
- François Bohier (1535–1569)
- Guillaume Ruzé (1570–1572)
- François Thomé (1573–1586)
- Charles de Bourgneuf (1586–1596)
- Jean du Bec (1598–1610)
- Guillaume le Gouverneur (1610–1630)

[Octavien de Marillac (1630)]

- Achille de Harlay de Sancy (1631–1644)
- Ferdinand de Neufville (1644–1657)
- François de Villemontée (1658–1670)
- Sébastien de Guémadeuc (1671–1702)
- Vincent-François des Maretz (1702–1739)
- Jean-Joseph de Fogasses (1739–1767)
- Antoine-Joseph des Laurents (1767–1785)
- Gabriel Cortois de Pressigny (1785–1791)

Siméon L'Archant de Grimouville (1817)

== See also ==
- Catholic Church in France
- List of Catholic dioceses in France

== Sources ==
- Duchesne, Louis Fastes épiscopaux de l'ancienne Gaule: Vol. II: L'Aquitaine et les Lyonnaises. (in French). deuxième edition. Paris: Thorin & fils, 1899
- Gams, Pius Bonifatius (1873). Series episcoporum Ecclesiae catholicae: quotquot innotuerunt a beato Petro apostolo. Ratisbon: Typis et Sumptibus Georgii Josephi Manz. pp. 548–549. (Use with caution; obsolete)
- Eubel, Conradus, ed. (1913). Hierarchia catholica (in Latin). Vol. 1 (second ed.). Münster: Libreria Regensbergiana. p. 301.
- Eubel, Conradus, ed. (1914). Hierarchia catholica (in Latin). Vol. 2 (second ed.). Münster: Libreria Regensbergiana. p. 175.
- Eubel, Conradus, ed. (1923). Hierarchia catholica (in Latin). Vol. 3 (second ed.). Münster: Libreria Regensbergiana.
- Gauchat, Patritius (Patrice) (1935). Hierarchia catholica (in Latin). Vol. IV (1592–1667). Münster: Libraria Regensbergiana. p. 219.
- Hauréau, Bartholomaeus (1856). Gallia Christiana: in provincias ecclesiasticas distributa. (in Latin). Volume 14 Paris: Didot, 1856. pp. 993–1037; "instrumenta," pp. 233–244.
- Ritzler, Remigius; Sefrin, Pirminus (1952). Hierarchia catholica medii et recentis aevi (in Latin). Vol. V (1667–1730). Patavii: Messagero di S. Antonio.
- Ritzler, Remigius; Sefrin, Pirminus (1958). Hierarchia catholica medii et recentis aevi (in Latin). Vol. VI (1730–1799). Patavii: Messagero di S. Antonio. pp. 271–272.
- Jean, Armand (1891). Les évêques et les archevêques de France depuis 1682 jusqu'à 1801 (in French). Paris: A. Picard.
- Pisani, Paul (1907). Répertoire biographique de l'épiscopat constitutionnel (1791–1802) (in French). Paris: A. Picard et fils.
- Tresvaux, François Marie (1839). L' église de Bretagne ou histoire des siéges épiscopaux, séminaires et collégiales, abbayes et autres communautés de cette province: d'après les matériaux de Dom Hyacinthe Morice de Beaubois. (in French). Paris: Mequignon, 1839.
