= Villevieux =

- Commune
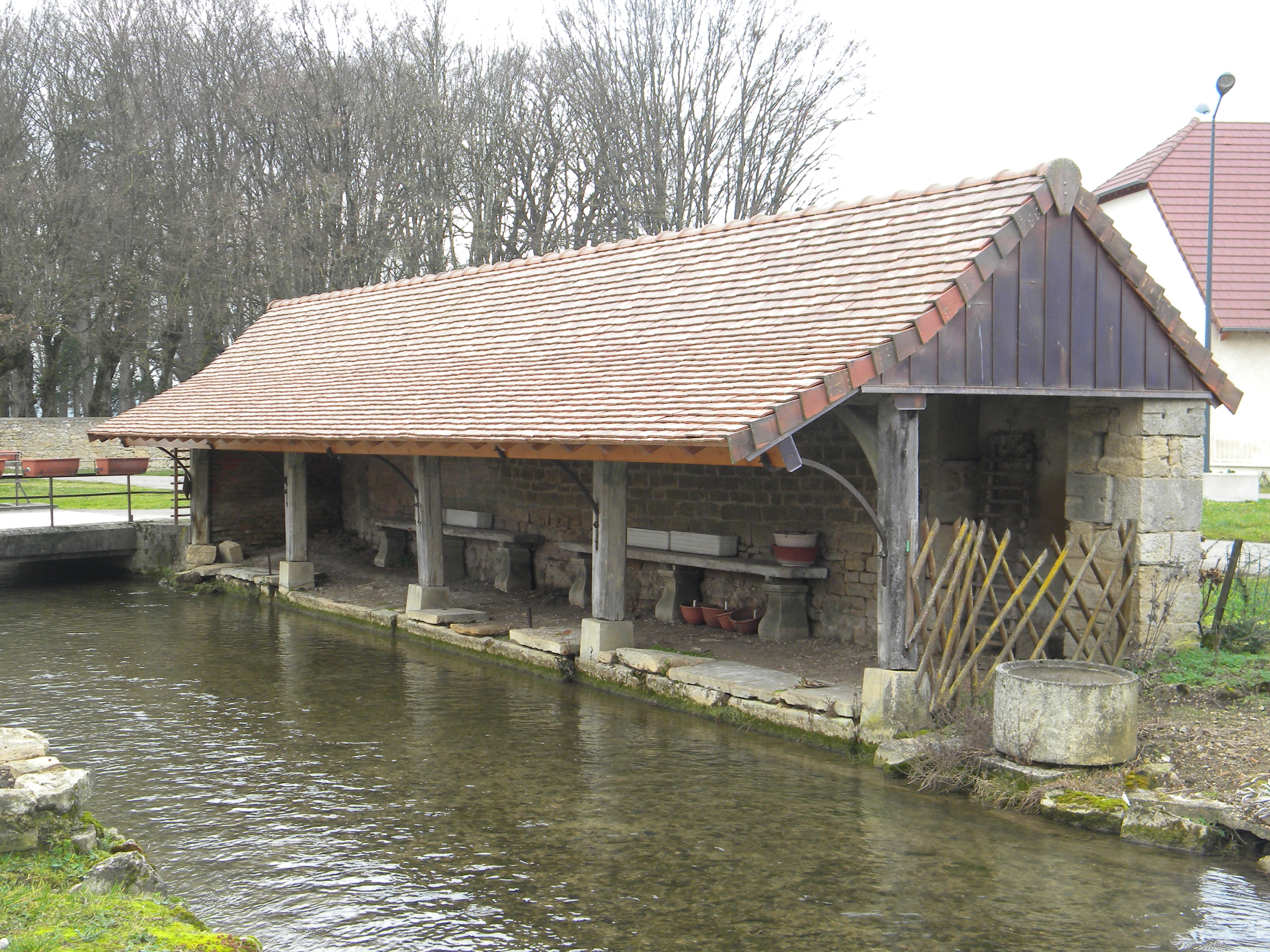
- Wash house
- Location of Villevieux
- Location within France Location within Bourgogne-Franche-Comté
- Coordinates: 46°44′18″N 5°27′55″E
- Country: France
- Region: Bourgogne-Franche-Comté
- Department: Jura
- Arrondissement: Lons-le-Saunier
- Canton: Bletterans

Government
  - Mayor (2021–2026): Pascal Bouvier
- Area^{1}: 9.87 km^{2} (3.81 sq mi)
- Highest elevation: 208 m (682 ft)
- Lowest elevation: 193 m (633 ft)
- Population (2023): 705
  - Density: 71.4/km^{2} (185/sq mi)
- Time zone: UTC+01:00 (CET)
  - Summer (DST): UTC+02:00 (CEST)
- INSEE/Postal code: 39574 /39140
- ^{1} French Land Register data, which excludes lakes, ponds, glaciers > 1 km^{2} (0.386 sq mi or 247 acres) and river estuaries.

Villevieux (French pronunciation: [vilvjø]) is a commune in the Jura department in the Bourgogne-Franche-Comté region in eastern France.

== Population ==
Historical population
Year	Pop.	±% p.a.
1968	492	—
1975	506	+0.40%
1982	600	+2.46%
1990	631	+0.63%
1999	670	+0.67%
2007	718	+0.87%
2012	725	+0.19%
2017	712	−0.36%
2023	705	−0.16%
Source: INSEE

== See also ==
- Communes of the Jura department
