= Paul Pisani =

- Born: 1852
- Died: 1933 (aged 80–81)
- Occupations: a Franciscan friar and historian

Paul Pisani (1852–1933) was a Franciscan friar and historian from France.

== Family background ==
Pisani's ancestors of French-Italian origin settled at the Levant at the end of the 18th century. They served French and Russian embassies in Constantinople. Pisani was therefore fluent in French and Italian and also had some knowledge of Serbo-Croatian.

== Career ==
Pisani was ordained a priest in 1878 and received his D.Litt. in 1893. He was a professor at the Institut Catholique de Paris from 1888 to 1889 and from 1908 to 1922. He was a close friend of Monseigneur Maurice Le Sage d'Hauteroche d'Hulst, founder of the Institut Catholique, and was his secretary from 1884 to 1888.

== Selected works ==
- Les journaux français dans les Provinces Illyriennes pendant l'époque impériale - Paris 1887
- La Légende de Skanderbeg - 1891
- Num Ragusini ab omni iure Veneto a sæc. x usque ad sæac. xiv immunes fuerint - 1893
- La Dalmatie de 1797 à 1815 - 1893
- Études d'histoire religieuse: A travers l'Orient - 1987
- Répertoire biographique de l'épiscopat constitutionnel (1791-1802) - 1907
- Les Missions protestantes à la fin du XIXe siècle - 1908
- L'église de Paris et la revolution - 1911
- Les compagnies de prêtres du XVIe au XVIIIe siècle - 1928

Pisani emphasized in his works that the pretended racial unity of the population of the Illyrian Provinces was partially imaginary. He was a friend of Tullio Erber, whose interpretation of some events was, according to Pisani, influenced by the Austrian government that was employer of Erber.
