= Marne et Seine bus network =

Public bus network in France

Marne et Seine
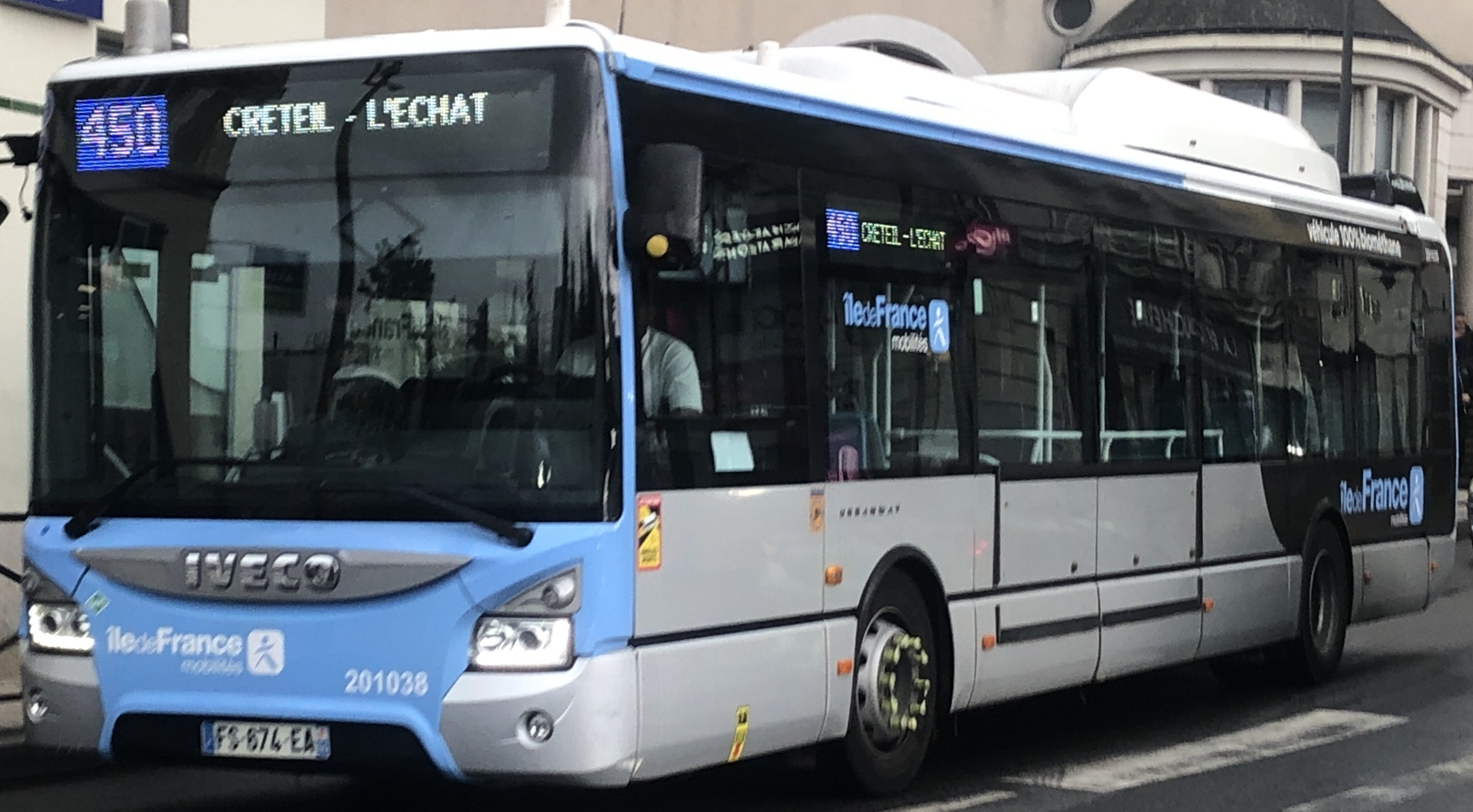
- An Iveco Urbanway 12 GNV on line 450 at Villeneuve-Saint-Georges station.
- Parent: Île-de-France Mobilités
- Founded: August 1, 2023
- Service area: Seine-et-Marne: (Férolles-Attilly, Pontault-Combault, Servon); Essonne: (Brunoy, Crosne, Yerres); Val-de-Marne: (Boissy-Saint-Léger, Bonneuil-sur-Marne, Champigny-sur-Marne, Chennevières-sur-Marne, Créteil, Limeil-Brévannes, Maisons-Alfort, Marolles-en-Brie, Noiseau, Ormesson-sur-Marne, La Queue-en-Brie, Saint-Maur-des-Fossés, Santeny, Sucy-en-Brie, Valenton, Villecresnes, Villeneuve-Saint-Georges)
- Routes: 427 428 429 430 431 432 433; 434 435 436 437 438 439 440; 441 442 443 444 445 446 447; 448 449 450 451
- Operator: Transdev (Transdev Coteaux de la Marne)
- Website: Marne et Seine website

Marne et Seine bus network is a French bus network run by Île-de-France Mobilités, operated by Transdev through his subsidiary Transdev Coteaux de la Marne from August 1, 2023.

The network consists of 26 lines, including nine school lines (Note: The school lines only concern the lines numbered 441 to 449.) and one express line.

== History ==
=== Network development ===
==== Opening to the competition ====
Due to the opening up of public transport to competition in Île-de-France, the Marne et Seine bus network will be created on 1 August 2023, corresponding to public service delegation number 21 established by Île-de-France Mobilités. A call for tenders was therefore launched by the organizing authority in order to designate a company that will operate the network for a period of eight years. It was finally Transdev, via its subsidiary Transdev Coteaux de la Marne, which was designated during the board of directors of December 7, 2022.

The network consisted of lines 2, 7, 8, 10, 21, 22, 41, 42, 51, 71, 81 and 82 of SITUS, operated by CEA Transports, lines 1, 3, 4, 5, 6, 9 of SITUS and line 12 of Arlequin operated by Transdev SETRA, plus the lines B, J1, J2, K, O1, O2 and U of Transdev STRAV.

On January 1, 2024 and following the end of the outgoing contract, the Express 100 Torcy-Créteil line is taken over by Transdev Coteaux de la Marne.

On December 13, 2025, the Câble C1 which was originally included in the Marne et Seine bus network debuted his operations.

==== Network renaming ====
As of April 8, 2024, the Marne et Seine network will apply the new single regional numbering principle planned by Île-de-France Mobilités, removing duplicates and letters. The correspondence between old and new numbers is as follows: lines J1 and J2 merge into a single line 427 and lines 429 and 430 get new services:

Network renaming
Old	New
J1; J2	427
K	428
O1	429
O2	430
1	431
2	432
3	433
4	434
5	435
6	436
7	437
8	438
9	439
10	440
21	441
22	442
41	443
42	444
51	445
71	446
81	447
82	448
U	449
B	450
12	451

== Routes ==
Image	Line	First direction	Second direction
	427	Gare de Boissy-Saint-Léger	Villeneuve-Saint-Georges — Les Graviers
	428	Gare de Villeneuve-Saint-Georges	Créteil — Préfecture
	429	Créteil–L'Échat	Limeil-Brévannes — Emile Combes - Descartes
	430	Gare de Boissy-Saint-Léger	Créteil–L'Échat
	431	Gare de Sucy–Bonneuil	École des Bruyères
	432	Gare de Sucy–Bonneuil	Mairie de Noiseau; Gare de Émerainville - Pontault-Combault
	433	Gare de Sucy–Bonneuil	Noiseau – Claude Monet
	434	Gare de Sucy–Bonneuil	Sucy-en-Brie – Les Monrois; Lycée de Sucy
	435	Gare de Sucy–Bonneuil	Gare de Boissy-Saint-Léger
	436	Gare de Les Boullereaux-Champigny	Gare de Boissy-Saint-Léger
	437	Gare de Champigny - Saint-Maur	Pontault-Combault – Centre Commercial Les 4 Chênes
	438	Gare de La Varenne–Chennevières	Chennevières-sur-Marne – Centre Commercial Pince Vent
	439	Gare de Sucy–Bonneuil (circular line)	
	440	Gare de Sucy–Bonneuil	Chennevières-sur-Marne – Centre Commercial Pince Vent
	441	Gare de Sucy–Bonneuil	Sucy-en-Brie – Collège du Fort
	442	Noiseau – La Garenne	Sucy-en-Brie – Collège du Parc/Parc de Sucy
	443	Gare de Sucy–Bonneuil	Sucy-en-Brie – Collège du Fort
	444	Sucy-en-Brie – Les Berges	Sucy-en-Brie – Collège du Fort
	445	Gare de Boissy-Saint-Léger	Groupe scolaire Amédée Dunois
	446	La Queue-en-Brie — Petit Caporal	Chennevières-sur-Marne — Lycée Champlain
	447	Chennevières-sur-Marne — Moulin Vert	Collège Molière
	448	Chennevières-sur-Marne — Moulin Vert	Lycée Champlain
	449	Villecresnes (circular line)	
	450	Créteil–L'Échat	Yerres — Abbaye/Cimetière; Gare de Brunoy
	451	Créteil-Préfecture; Gare de Boissy-Saint-Léger	Servon — Centre commercial Eden
	100	Gare de Torcy	Créteil–L'Échat

== See also ==
- Île-de-France Mobilités
- Câble C1
