= Nogent-sur-Marne station =

Railway station in Nogent-sur-Marne, Val-de-Marne, France

Nogent-sur-Marne
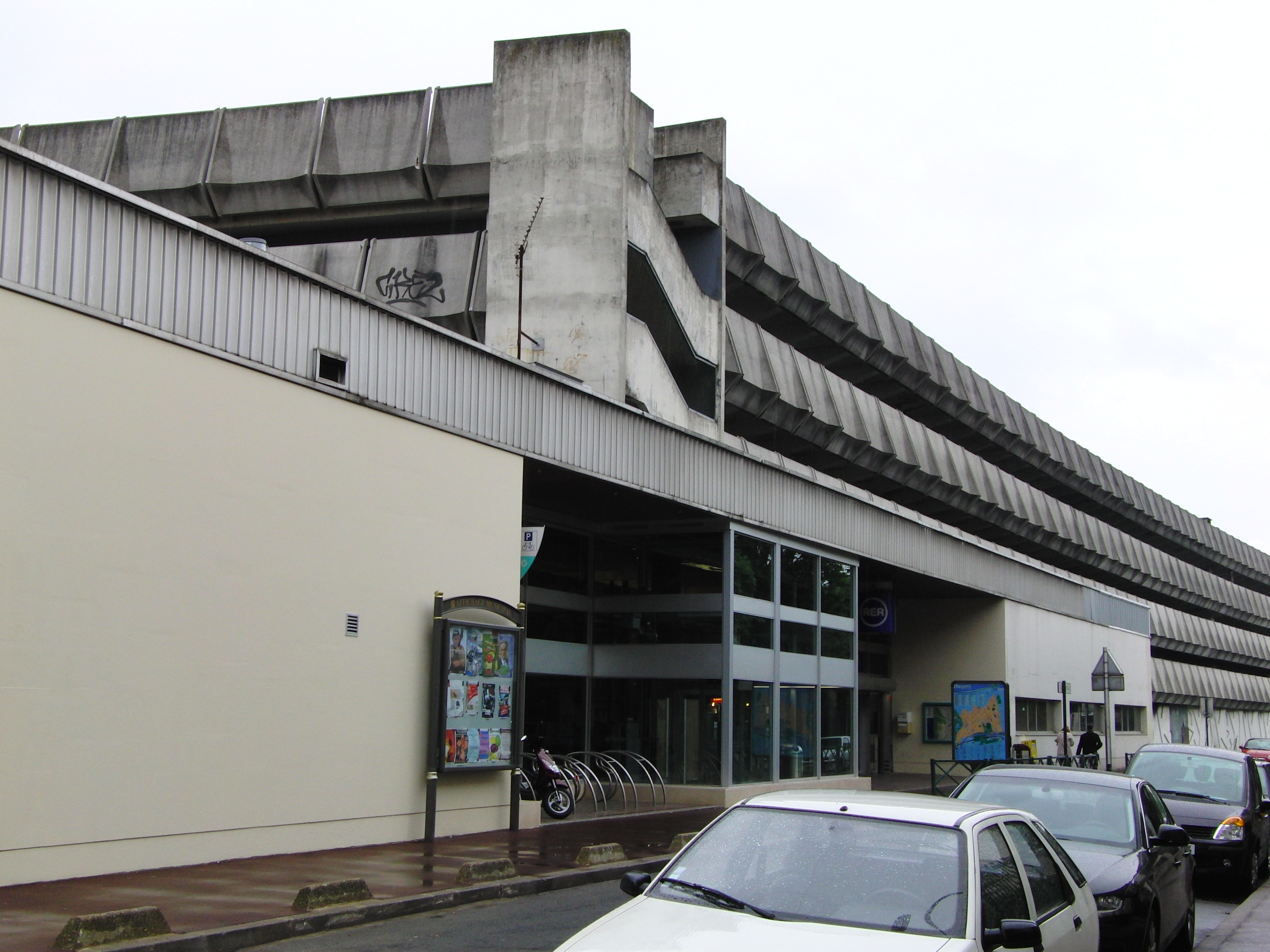
- Entrance to Nogent-sur-Marne station

General information
- Location: Avenue des Marronniers; Nogent-sur-Marne; France
- Coordinates: 48°50′07″N 2°28′18″E
- Operator: RATP Group
- Line: Ligne de Vincennes
- Platforms: 2 side platforms
- Tracks: 2
- Connections: RATP Bus: 113 114 120 210; Noctilien: N33

Construction
- Structure type: Below-grade
- Cycle facilities: Racks
- Accessible: Yes, by request to staff

Other information
- Station code: 87758136
- Fare zone: 3

History
- Opened: 1969

Passengers
- 2014: 2,771,411

Services
Preceding station	RER	Following station
Fontenay-sous-Bois towards Saint-Germain-en-Laye	RER A	Joinville-le-Pont towards Boissy-Saint-Léger
Location

Nogent-sur-Marne station is a railway station on RER train network in Nogent-sur-Marne, Val-de-Marne, France.

== History ==
Nogent-sur-Marne station is on the Ligne de Vincennes railway. From 1859 to 1969, the Ligne de Vincennes ran between Paris–Bastille station and Marles-en-Brie. On 14 December 1969, Paris–Bastille station was closed, and the line was rerouted into a new 2.5 km (1.6 mi) tunnel under Paris between Nation and Vincennes stations, creating the first line of the Regional Metro network, later renamed the Réseau Express Régional.

== Transport ==
=== Train ===
The station is served by a train every 10 minutes at off-peak time in both directions. That frequency is increased during peak hours and falls to around one train every 15 minutes in late evening and early morning.

=== Bus connections ===
The station is served by several buses:

- RATP Bus:
  - 113 to Chelles
  - 114 between Château de Vincennes and Villemomble
  - 120 to Noisy-le-Grand
  - 210 between Château de Vincennes and Villiers-sur-Marne
- Noctilien:
  - N33 between Paris (Gare de Lyon) and Villiers-sur-Marne
