= Le Parc de Saint-Maur station =

Railway station in Saint-Maur-des-Fossés, France

Le Parc de Saint-Maur
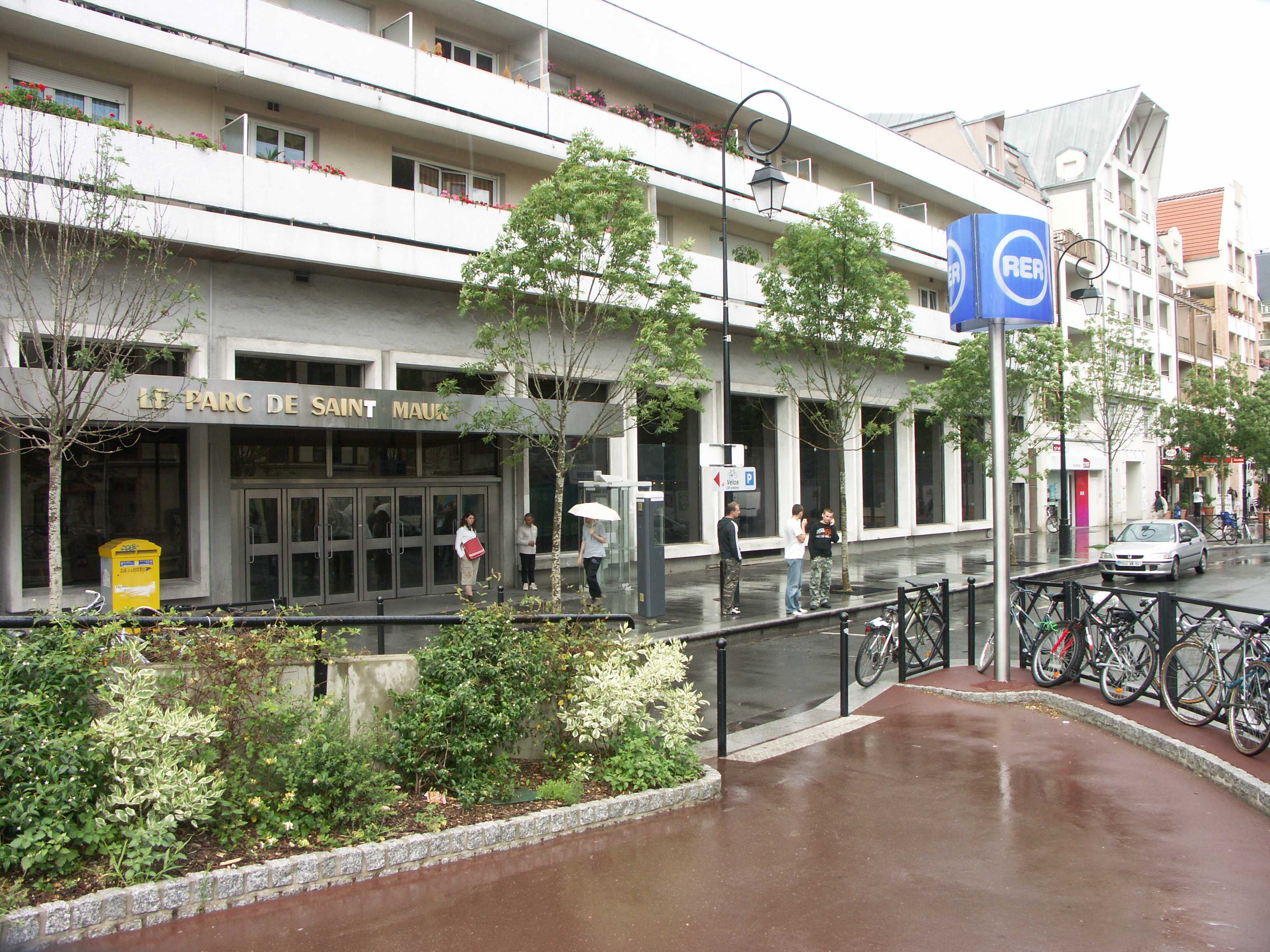
- Entrance of the station

General information
- Location: Rue André de Cayeux; Saint-Maur-des-Fossés; France
- Coordinates: 48°48′19″N 2°29′09″E
- Operator: RATP Group
- Line: Ligne de Vincennes
- Platforms: 2 side platforms
- Tracks: 2
- Connections: RATP Bus: 107 317

Construction
- Structure type: Below-grade
- Cycle facilities: Racks
- Accessible: Yes, by request to staff

Other information
- Station code: 87758169
- Fare zone: 3

History
- Opened: 1969

Services
Preceding station	RER	Following station
Saint-Maur–Créteil towards Saint-Germain-en-Laye	RER A	Champigny towards Boissy-Saint-Léger
Location

Le Parc de Saint-Maur station (French pronunciation: [lə paʁk də sɛ̃ mɔʁ]) is a French railway station in Saint-Maur-des-Fossés, Val-de-Marne, France.

== The station ==
The RER station opened in 1969 and is named after a district of Saint-Maur.

It is served by RER A trains running on branch A2, ending in Boissy-Saint-Léger.

== History ==
Le Parc de Saint-Maur station is on the Ligne de Vincennes railway. From 1859 to 1969 the Ligne de Vincennes ran between Paris–Bastille station and Marles-en-Brie. On 14 December 1969 Paris–Bastille station was closed and the line was rerouted into a new 2.5 km (1.6 mi) tunnel under Paris between Nation and Vincennes stations, creating the first line of the Regional Metro network, later renamed the Réseau Express Régional.

== Service ==
Le Parc de Saint-Maur is served in both directions by a train every 10 minutes at off-peak time, by 12 trains an hour during peak hours, and by a train every 15 minutes during the evening.

== Bus connections ==
- RATP Bus: 107 317

== See also ==
- List of stations of the Paris RER
