= Joinville-le-Pont station =

Train station in Joinville-le-Pont, France

Joinville-le-Pont
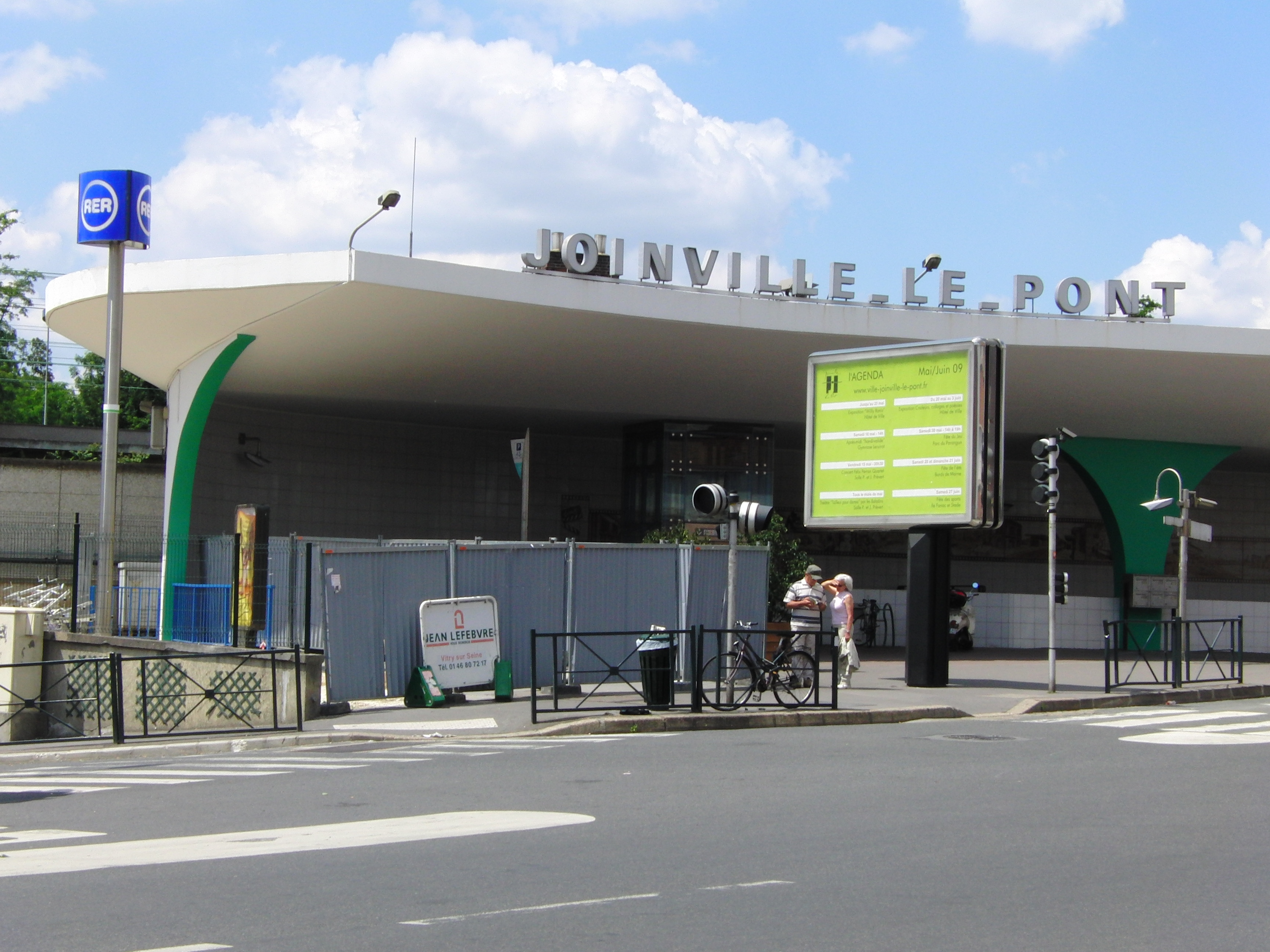
- Entrance to Joinville-le-Pont station

General information
- Location: Avenue Jean Jaurès; Joinville-le-Pont; France
- Coordinates: 48°49′13″N 2°27′49″E
- Operator: RATP Group
- Line: Ligne de Vincennes
- Platforms: 2 island platforms
- Tracks: 4
- Connections: RATP Bus: 77 101 106 108 110 112 201 281; Noctilien: N33

Construction
- Structure type: Embankment
- Cycle facilities: Covered racks
- Accessible: Yes, by request to staff

Other information
- Station code: 87758144
- Fare zone: 3

History
- Opened: 22 September 1859
- Rebuilt: 1969

Services
Preceding station	RER	Following station
Nogent-sur-Marne towards Saint-Germain-en-Laye	RER A	Saint-Maur–Créteil towards Boissy-Saint-Léger
Location

Joinville-le-Pont station (French pronunciation: [ʒwɑ̃vij lə pɔ̃]) is a railway station in the French commune of Joinville-le-Pont, Val-de-Marne, a southeastern suburb of Paris.

== History ==
Joinville-le-Pont station opened in its current form on 14 December 1969 as part of the initial segment of the RER network with service between Nation in central Paris and Boissy-Saint-Léger.

== Service ==
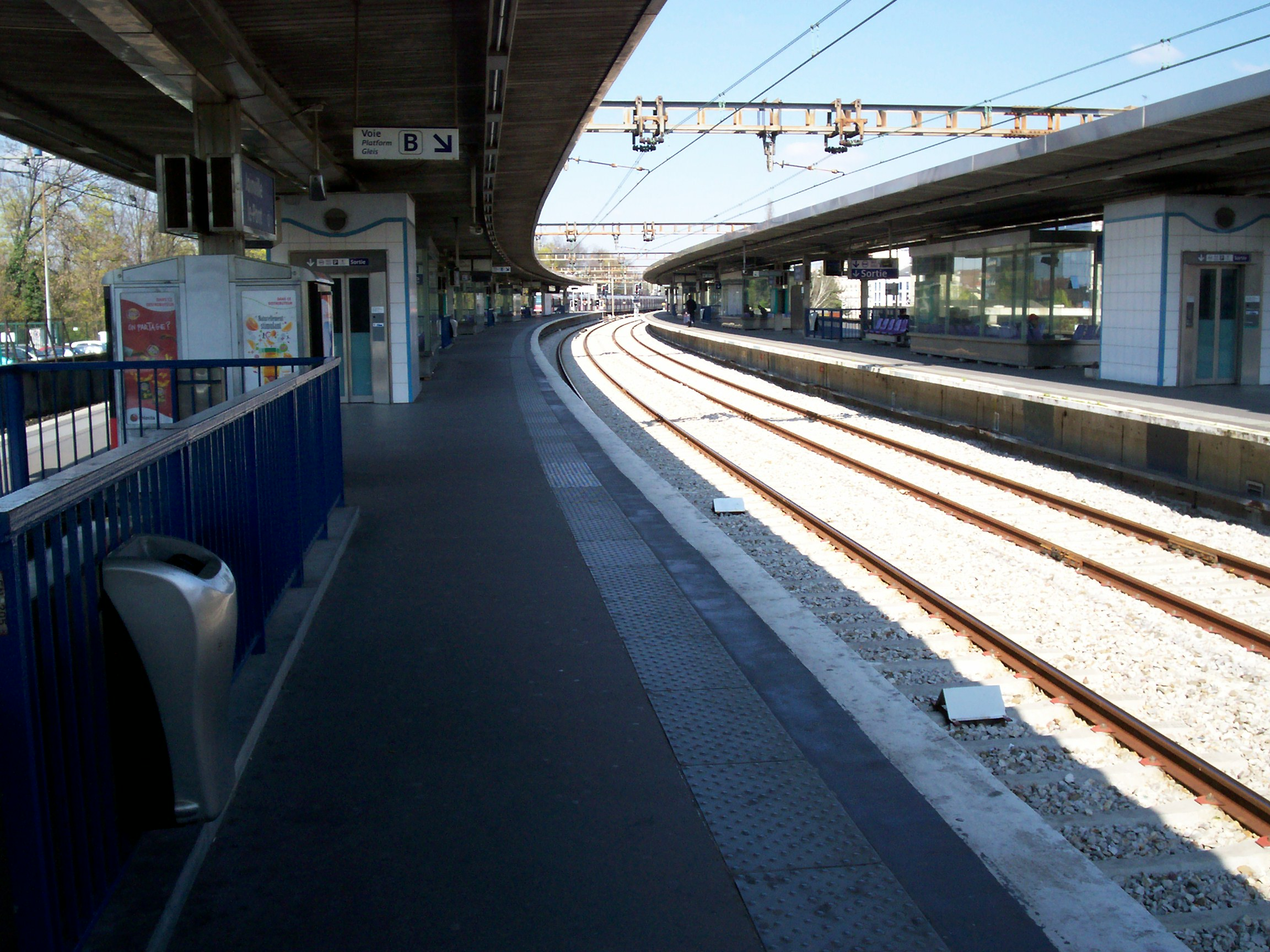
Platforms

Joinville-le-Pont is on the A2 branch of the RER A and receives frequent service westbound to Saint-Germain-en-Laye on the A1 branch and Boissy-Saint-Léger eastbound on the A2 branch. At peak times there are up to twelve trains per hour (one train every five minutes), during off-peak hours trains arrive every ten minutes, and early mornings and late nights trains come at fifteen-minute intervals.

=== Bus connections ===
The station is served by several buses:

- RATP Bus: 77 101 106 108 110 112 201 281
- Noctilien: N33
