= La Varenne–Chennevières station =

Railway station in Saint-Maur-des-Fossés, France

La Varenne–Chennevières
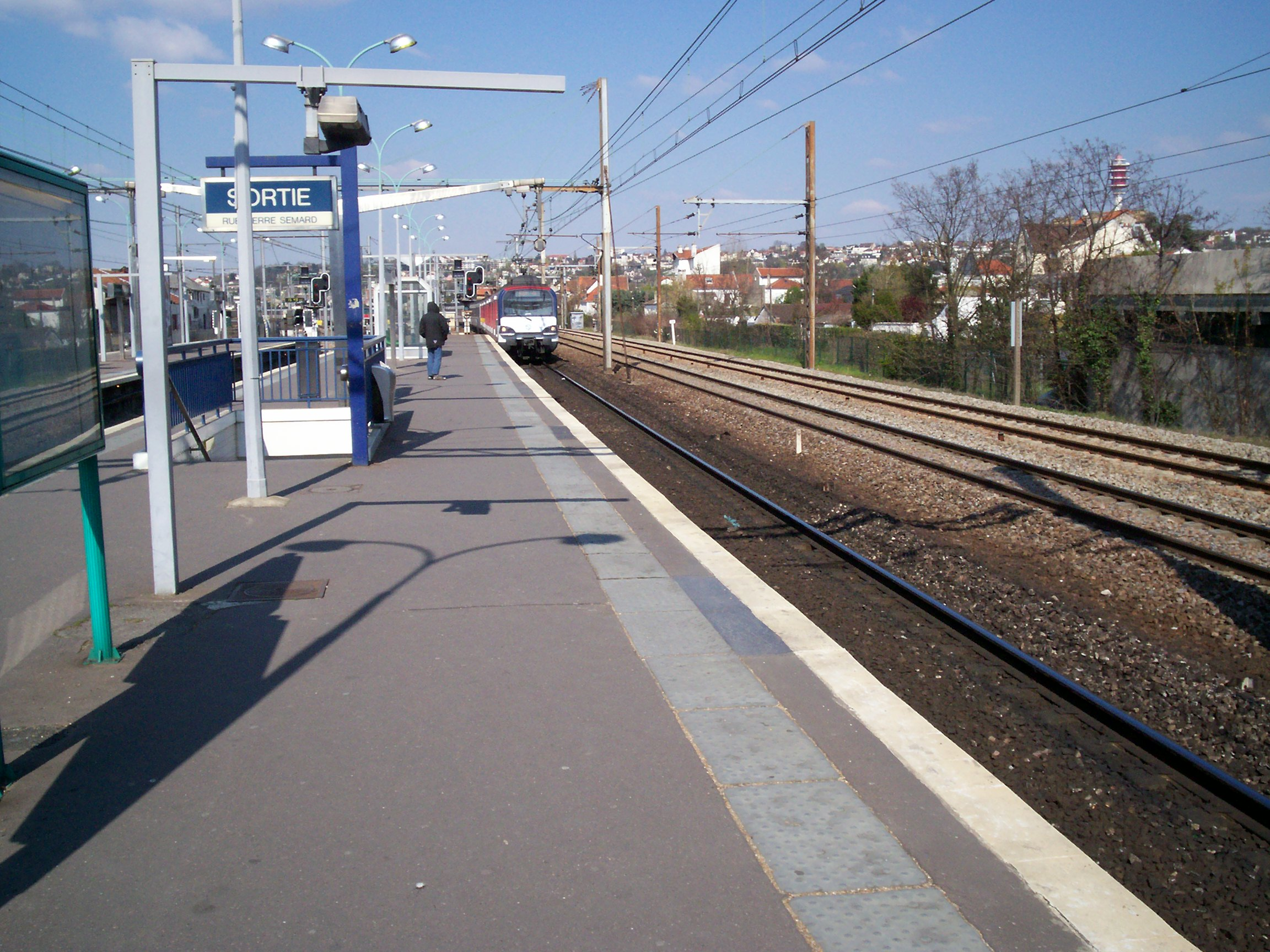

General information
- Location: Avenue du Mesnil; Saint-Maur-des-Fossés; France
- Coordinates: 48°47′42″N 2°30′46″E
- Operator: RATP Group
- Line: Ligne de Vincennes
- Platforms: 2 island platforms
- Tracks: 3 station tracks + 2 bypass tracks
- Connections: RATP Bus: 111 112; Situs: 8; Marne et Seine: 438

Construction
- Structure type: At-grade
- Accessible: Yes, by request to staff

Other information
- Station code: 87758185
- Fare zone: 3

History
- Opened: 1969

Services
Preceding station	RER	Following station
Champigny towards Saint-Germain-en-Laye	RER A	Sucy–Bonneuil towards Boissy-Saint-Léger
Location

La Varenne–Chennevières station is a French railway station in Saint-Maur-des-Fossés, in Val-de-Marne, France.

== The station ==
The RER station was designed by Marcel Lods and opened in 1969. It is named after the former commune La Varenne, now part of Saint-Maur-des-Fossés, and the close commune Chennevières-sur-Marne.

It is served by RER line A trains running on A2 branch, leading to Boissy-Saint-Léger.

La Varenne–Chennevières is also a depot for trains. It houses premises for RATP officers training.

== Service ==
The station is served in both directions by a train every 10 minutes at off-peak time, by 12 trains an hour during peak hours, and by a train every 15 minutes in the evening. It is also a terminus station for some trains at peak hours.

== Bus connections ==
The station is served by several buses:

- RATP Bus: 111 112
- Situs: 8
- Marne et Seine: 438

== Gallery ==
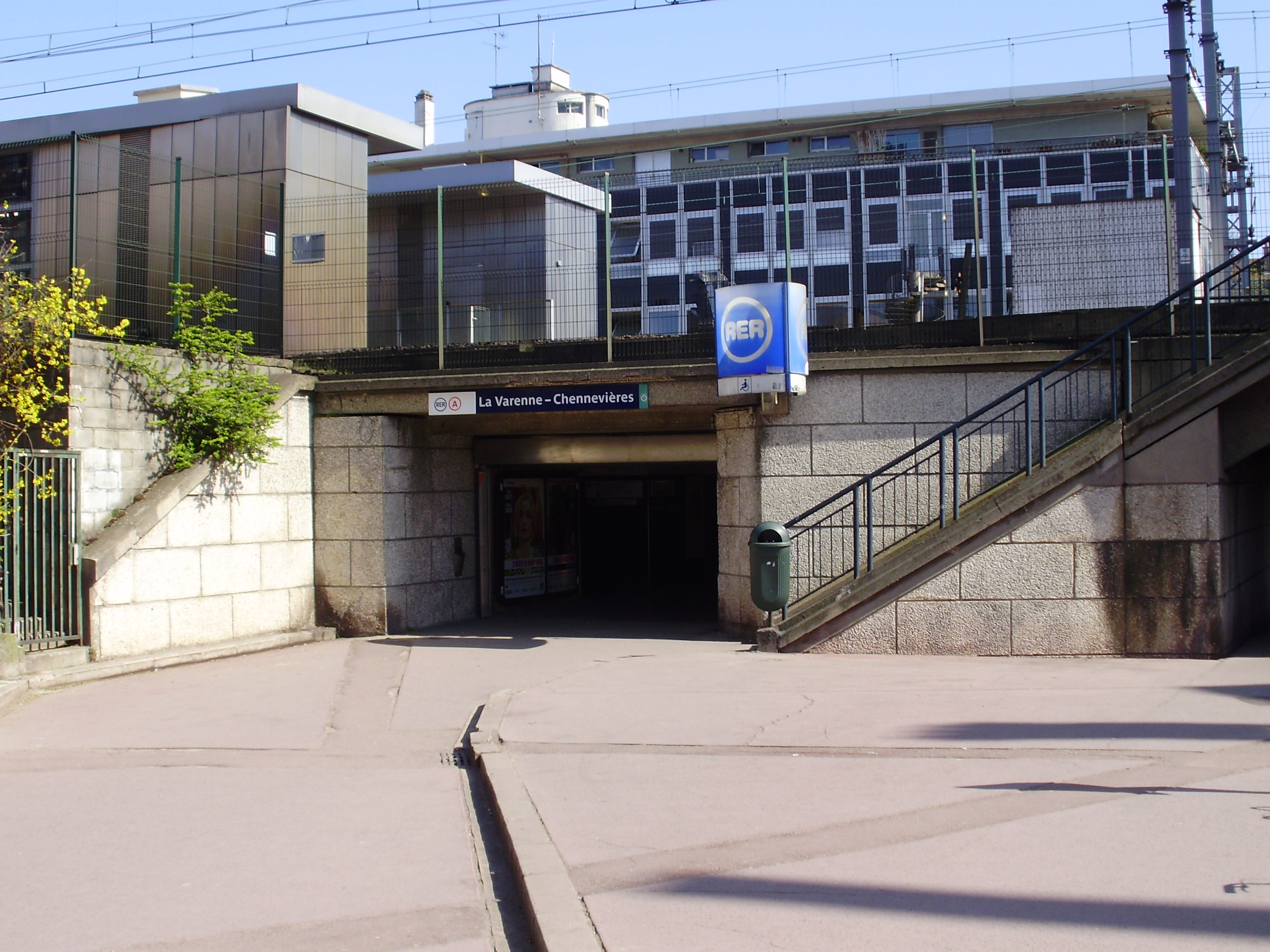
Entrance of the station, avenue du Bac (north-west the tracks)

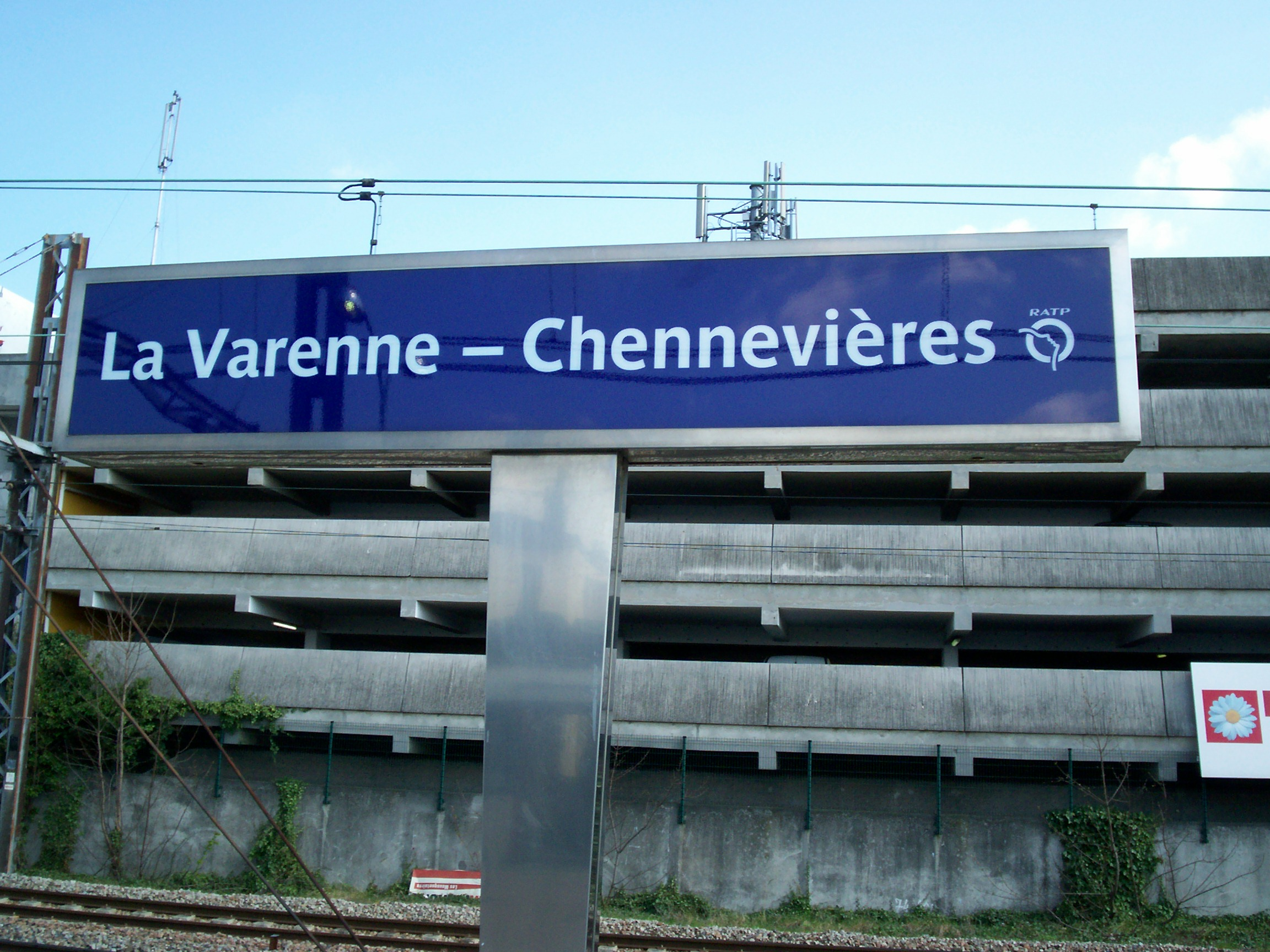
Sign of the name station on a platform

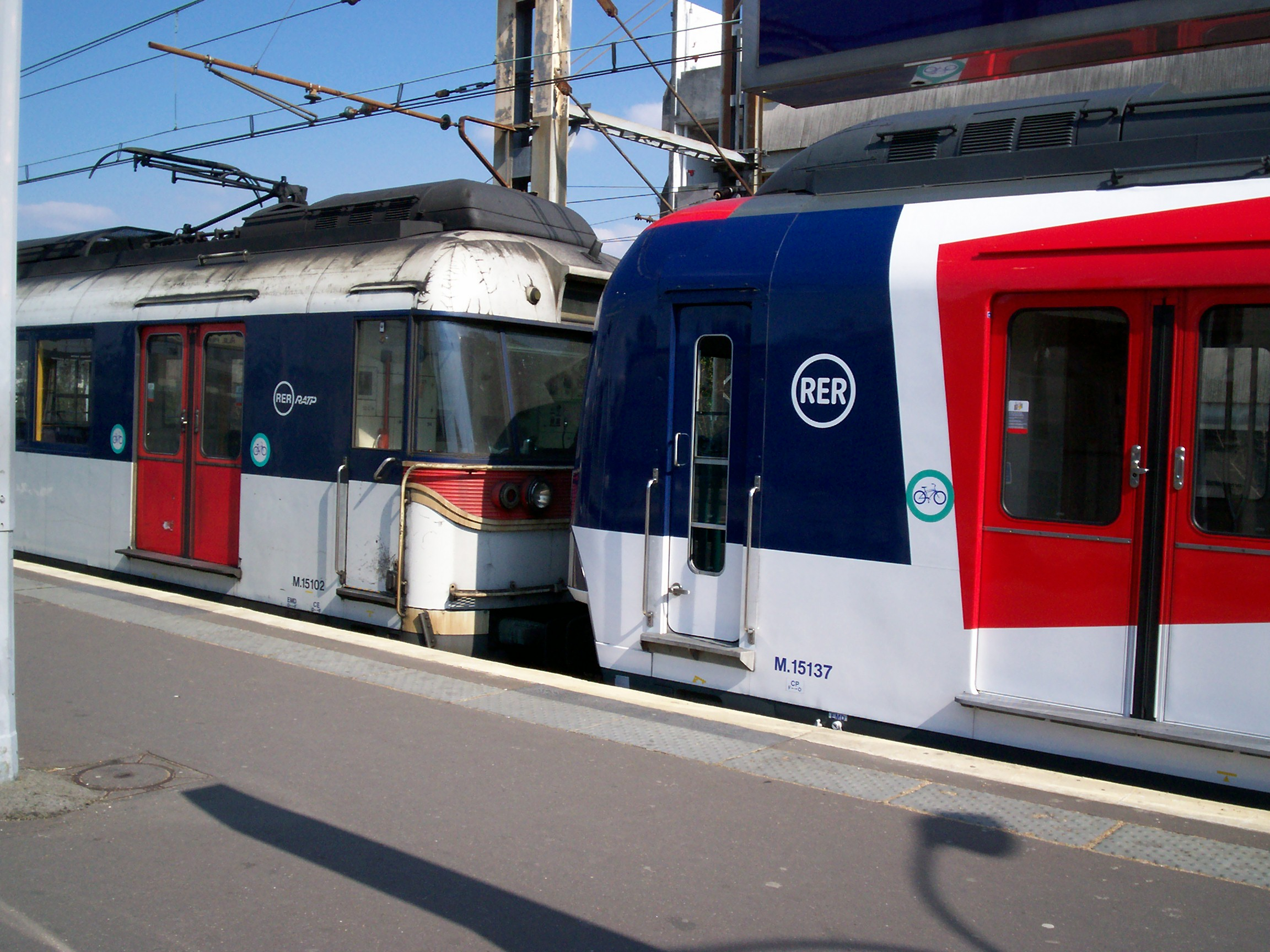
Carriage made of two different MS 61 materials
(MS 61 A/B and MS 61 R)

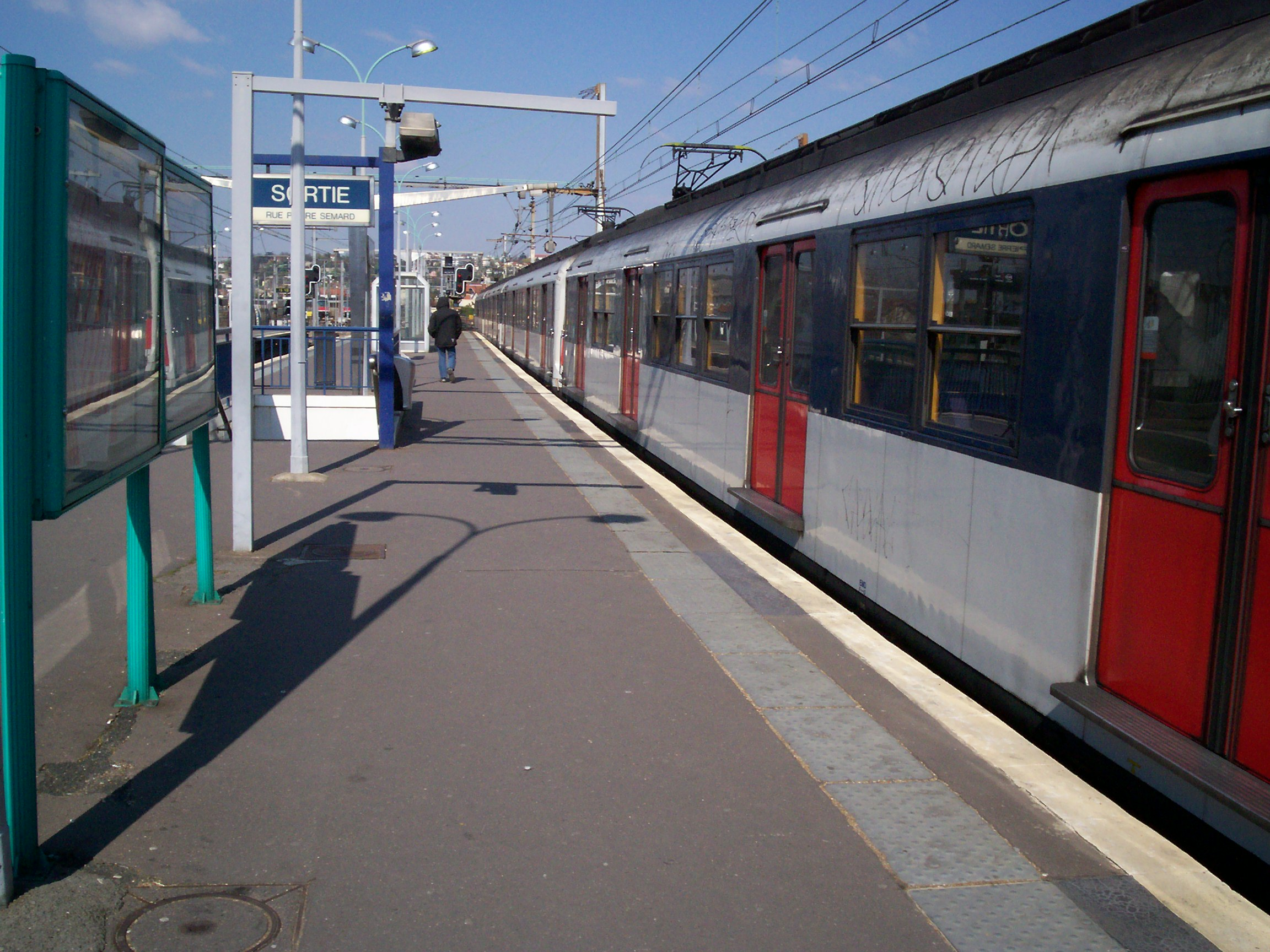
MS 61 carriage about to leave toward Paris

== See also ==
- List of stations of the Paris RER
