= Fontenay-sous-Bois station =

Railway station in Fontenay-sous-Bois, France

Fontenay-sous-Bois
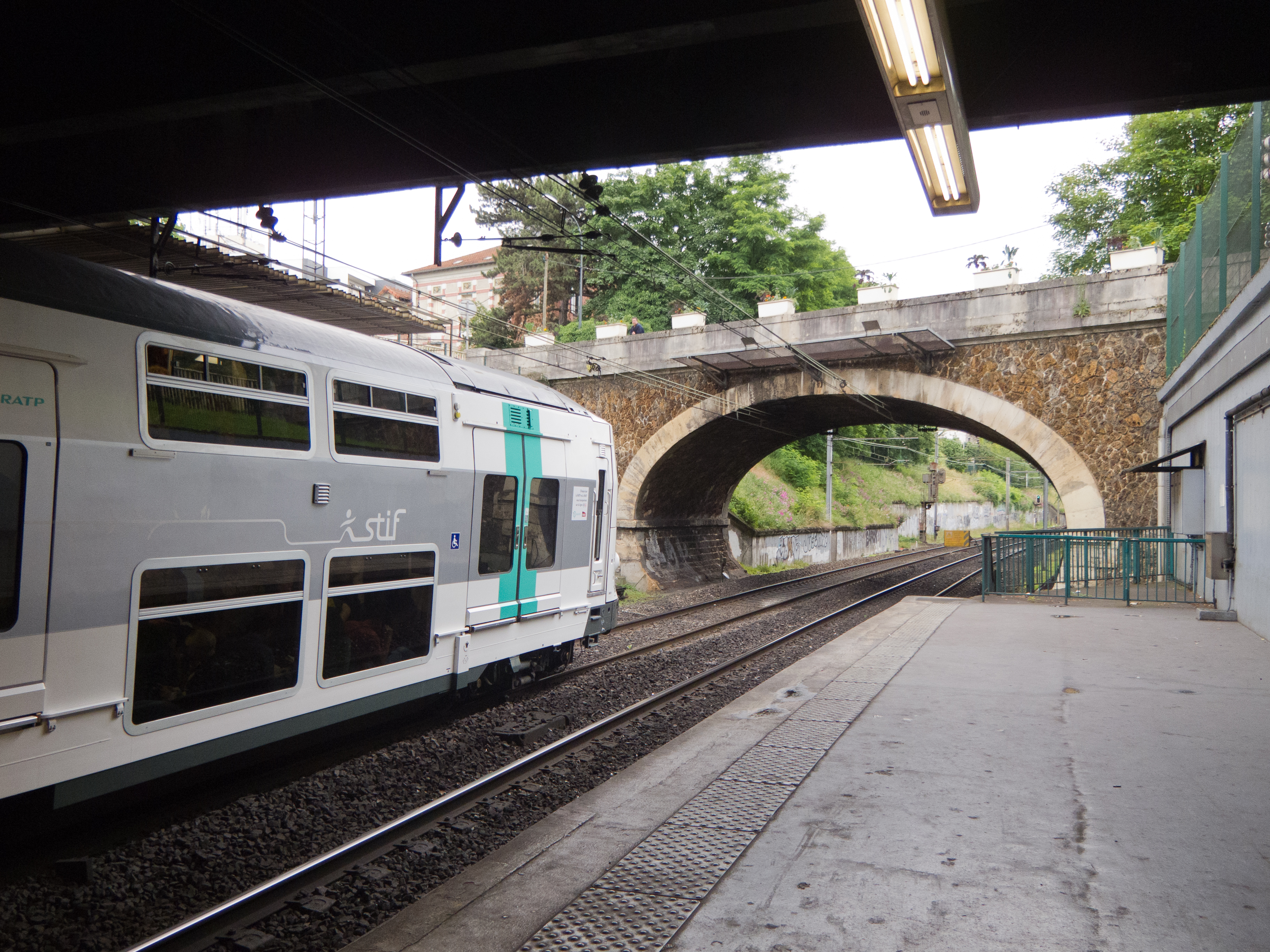
- Fontenay-sous-Bois station platforms

General information
- Location: Fontenay-sous-Bois; France
- Coordinates: 48°50′37″N 2°27′50″E
- Operator: RATP Group
- Line: Ligne de Vincennes
- Platforms: 2 side platforms
- Tracks: 2
- Connections: RATP Bus: 124 210 524

Construction
- Accessible: Yes, by request to staff

Other information
- Station code: 87758128
- Fare zone: 3

History
- Opened: 1969

Services
Preceding station	RER	Following station
Vincennes towards Saint-Germain-en-Laye	RER A	Nogent-sur-Marne towards Boissy-Saint-Léger
Location

Fontenay-sous-Bois station is a railway station on Réseau Express Régional network in Fontenay-sous-Bois, Val-de-Marne, France.

== History ==
Fontenay-sous-Bois station is on the Ligne de Vincennes railway. From 1859 to 1969 the Ligne de Vincennes ran between Paris–Bastille station and Marles-en-Brie. On 14 December 1969 Paris–Bastille station was closed and the line was rerouted into a new 2.5 km (1.6 mi) tunnel under Paris between Nation and Vincennes stations, creating the first line of the Regional Metro network, later renamed the Réseau Express Régional.

== Transport ==
=== Train ===
The station is served by a train every 10 minutes at off-peak time in both directions. That frequency is increased during peak hours, with up to 12 trains an hour, and falls to 1 train every 15 minutes at night.

=== Bus connections ===
The station is served by RATP Bus network lines:

- 124 between Val de Fontenay and Château de Vincennes
- 210 between Villiers-sur-Marne and Château de Vincennes
- 524 a shuttle service serving the different districts of Fontenay-sous-Bois

== Traffic ==
The number of people entering the station in 2014 was 2,469,377.
