= Saint-Maur - Champigny station =

Railway station in Saint-Maur-des-Fossés, France

Saint-Maur - Champigny
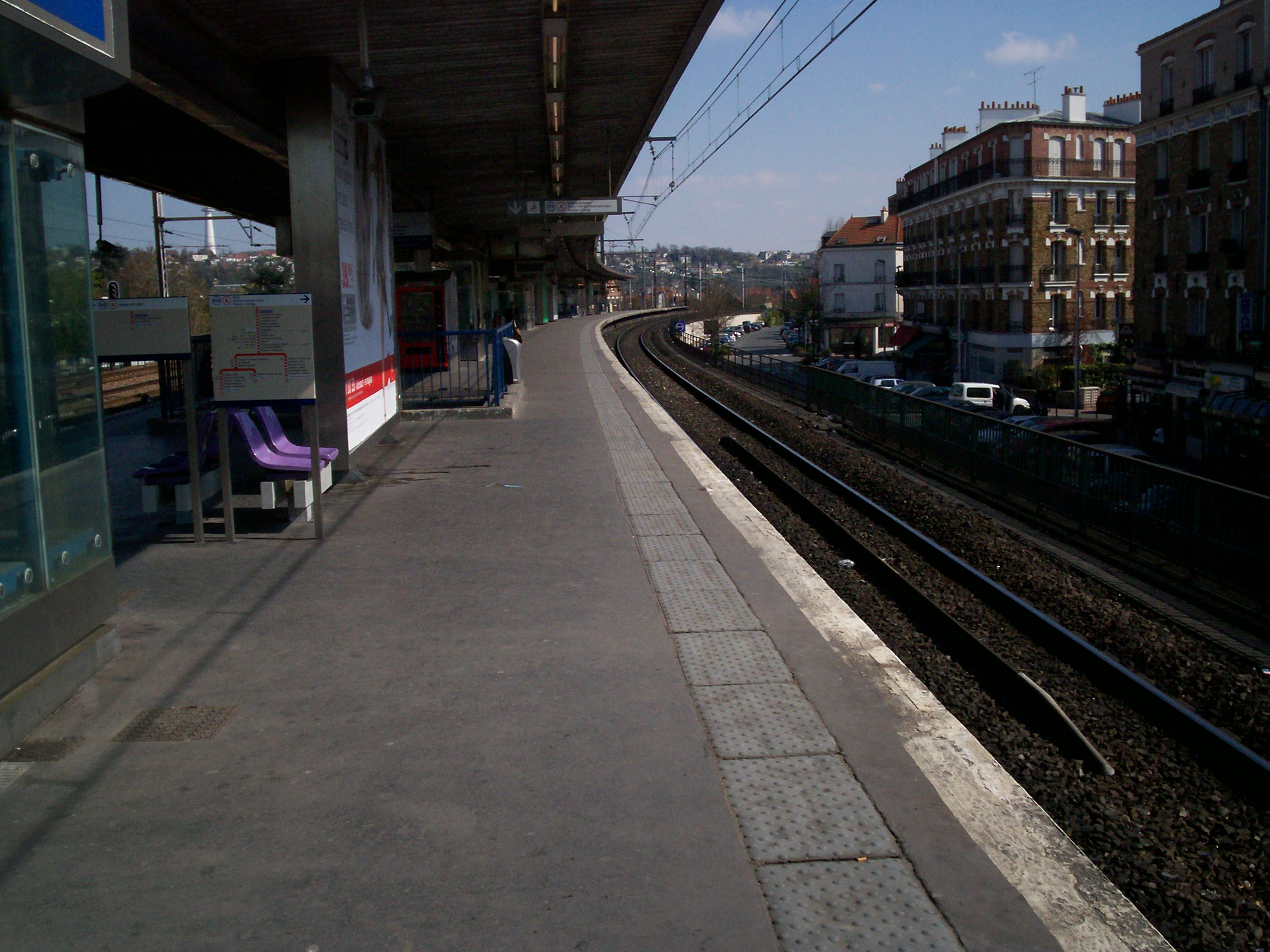
- Saint-Maur - Champigny station platform

General information
- Location: Place de la Gare de Champigny; Champigny-sur-Marne; France
- Coordinates: 48°48′26″N 2°30′35″E
- Operator: RATP Group
- Lines: Ligne de Vincennes; Grande Ceinture line
- Platforms: 1 island platform
- Tracks: 2 station tracks + 2 bypass tracks
- Connections: RATP Bus: 111 116 117 208a 208b 208s 306; Situs: 7; Noctilien: N35; Marne et Seine: 437

Construction
- Structure type: Elevated
- Parking: Yes
- Cycle facilities: Covered racks
- Accessible: Yes, by request to staff

Other information
- Station code: 87758177
- Fare zone: 3

History
- Opened: 1859
- Rebuilt: 1969

Services
Preceding station	RER	Following station
Le Parc de Saint-Maur towards Saint-Germain-en-Laye	RER A	La Varenne–Chennevières towards Boissy-Saint-Léger
Location

Saint-Maur - Champigny station is a railway station in the commune of Saint-Maur-des-Fossés, near the town Champigny-sur-Marne, Val-de-Marne, France. Champigny is on the A2 branch of the RER A with eastbound trains to Boissy-Saint-Léger and westbound trains to Saint-Germain-en-Laye. It is situated on the Grande Ceinture line.

== Bus connections ==
The station is served by several buses:

- RATP Bus: 111 116 117 208a 208b 208s 306
- Situs: 7
- Noctilien: N35
- Marne et Seine: 437
