= Impact Christian center =

- Impact centre chrétien
- Impact Christian center
- 48.7617°N 2.501°E
- Location: Croissy-Beaubourg, France
- Denomination: Communauté des Églises d'expressions africaines en France
- Website: impactcentrechretien.com

History
- Founded: 2002
- Founder(s): Yvan Castanou and Yves Castanou

Impact centre chrétien (French: Impact centre chrétien) is a charismatic Evangelical multi-site megachurch based in Boissy-Saint-Léger, France. It is affiliated with the Communauté des Églises d'expressions africaines en France.

== History ==
The Church was founded by pastors Yves and Yvan Castanou twin brothers, in 2002 in Ivry-sur-Seine, near Paris in France. In 2011, the church reached 1,500 people and moved to a new building in Boissy-Saint-Léger. Churches have been planted in Africa, America and Europe. In 2013, it would have 3,500 people. In 2025, the headquarters of Boissy-Saint-Léger had 2,000 people. In July 2023, it inaugurated a convention center at Croissy-Beaubourg, La Cité Royale, with a 3,780-seat auditorium.

== Beliefs ==
The Church has a charismatic confession of faith.
