= Yvan Castanou =

French evangelical pastor, author and speaker

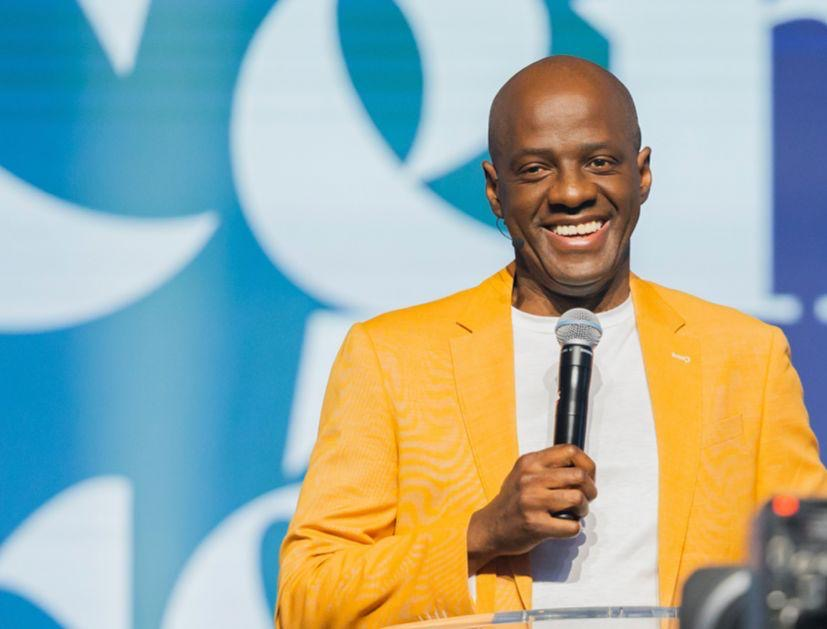
- Born: June 22, 1971 (age 54); Reims, France
- Occupation: Pastor of Impact Christian center
- Spouse: Modestine Castanou
- Children: 4

Yvan Castanou (born June 22, 1971) is a French evangelical pastor, author, and speaker. He is the co-founder and senior pastor of Impact Centre Chrétien (ICC), a megachurch with over 100 branches worldwide and more than 43,000 attendees each Sunday.

== Early life ==
Yvan Castanou was born on June 22, 1971, in Reims, France, into a Congolese family. Yvan Castanou spent part of his childhood in the Republic of the Congo, where he completed his primary and secondary education. After obtaining his baccalaureate in Pointe-Noire, he moved to France for higher education. He earned a DEUG in Mathematics and a DUT in Business and Administration Management, later graduating from Reims Management School in 1995 with a degree in business. He has a twin brother, Yves Castanou, who is also a pastor and public figure. Yves serves as the director-general of the Société de Patrimoine des Eaux du Congo (SPDE) and has been involved in both religious and public service sectors.

== Biography ==
In 1996, Castanou converted to Christianity, which led him to pursue theological studies. He studied in England and later continued his education at the Institut Biblique de Paris and the Academy of Advanced Theological and Pastoral Studies in Paris.

In 2002, Yvan Castanou and his twin brother, Yves Castanou, co-founded Impact Centre Chrétien (ICC) in Ivry-sur-Seine, near Paris, France. The church follows a charismatic confession of faith and has since expanded into a large evangelical network with congregations in Europe, Africa, North America, and the Caribbean. ICC holds multiple services every week, and tens of thousands of people follow its online broadcasts.

In March 2004, Yvan Castanou and his wife, Modestine Castanou, were ordained as pastors by André Thobois of the Protestant Federation of France and Emmanuel Toussaint of the World Protestant and Evangelical Council of Churches.

Yvan Castanou was ranked 7th among the most powerful Afro-French individuals in France by Business Africa magazine in 2024.

=== Books ===
Yvan Castanou has written several books, including:

- Maintenant ça suffit, il faut que ça change! (Now That's Enough, It Has to Change!)
- Vous pensez mariage? Comment faire le bon choix? (Are You Thinking of Marriage? How to Make the Right Choice?)
- Né de nouveau pour Gouverner de nouveau (Born Again to Rule Again)
- Prions Ensemble! (Let's Pray Together!)

== Personal life ==
Yvan Castanou is married to Modestine Castanou, who is also a pastor. The couple has four children.
