= Sucy–Bonneuil station =

Railway station in Sucy-en-Brie, France

Sucy–Bonneuil
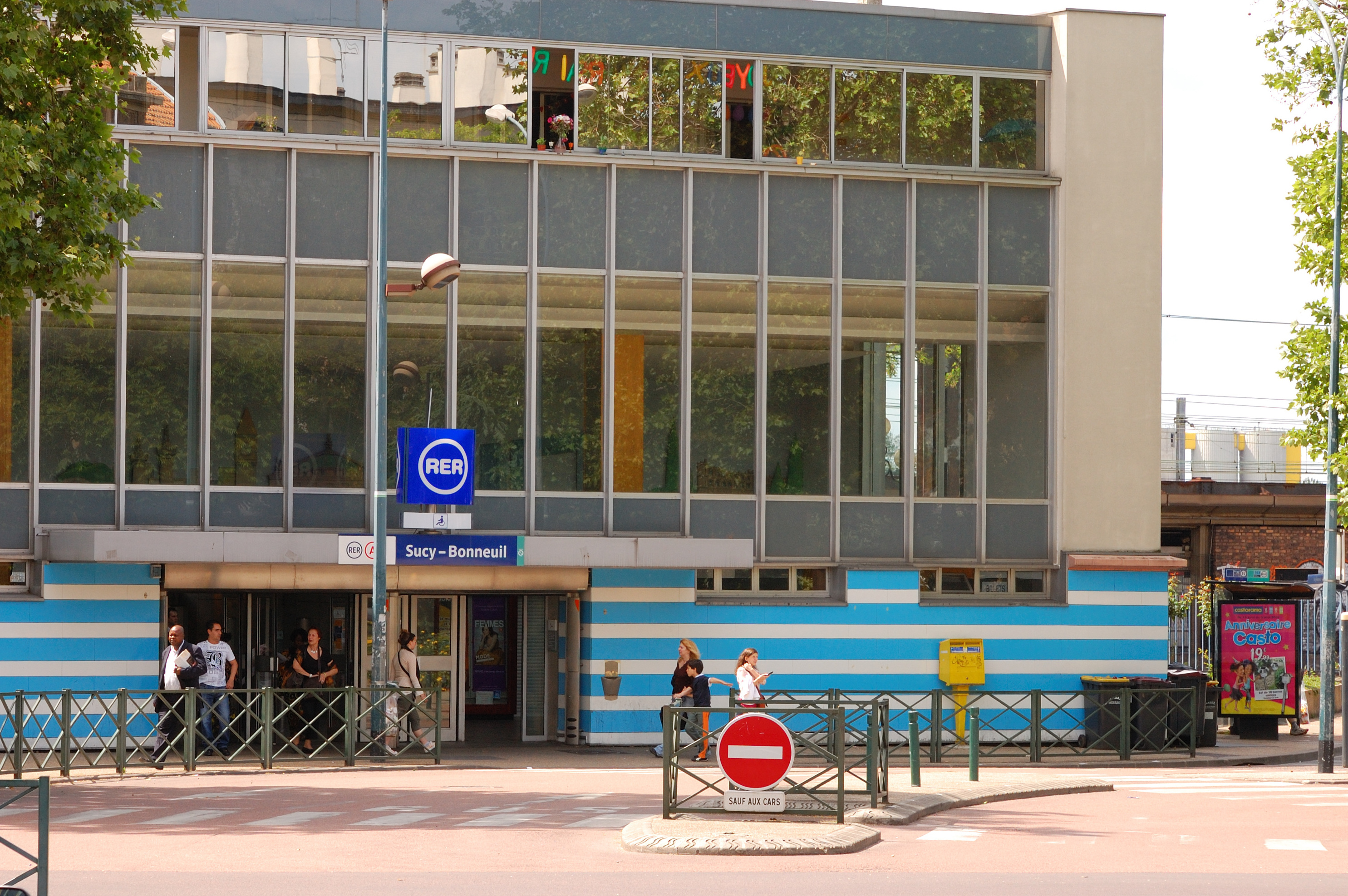

General information
- Location: Place de la Gare; Sucy-en-Brie; France
- Coordinates: 48°46′15″N 2°30′27″E
- Operator: RATP Group
- Line: Ligne de Vincennes
- Platforms: 2 side platforms
- Tracks: 2
- Connections: RATP Bus: 104 308 393; Marne et Seine: 431 432 433 434 435 436 440 441 443; Noctilien: N32

Construction
- Structure type: At-grade
- Parking: 415 spaces
- Cycle facilities: Covered parking racks
- Accessible: Yes, by request to staff

Other information
- Station code: 87758193
- Fare zone: 4

History
- Opened: 1969

Passengers
- 2014: 2,121,295

Services
Preceding station	RER	Following station
La Varenne–Chennevières towards Saint-Germain-en-Laye	RER A	Boissy-Saint-Léger Terminus
Location

Sucy–Bonneuil station is a railway station on network in Sucy-en-Brie, Val-de-Marne, France.

== History ==
Sucy–Bonneuil station is on the Ligne de Vincennes railway. From 1859 to 1969 the Ligne de Vincennes ran between Paris–Bastille station and Marles-en-Brie. On 14 December 1969 Paris–Bastille station was closed and the line was rerouted into a new 2.5 km (1.6 mi) tunnel under Paris between Nation and Vincennes stations, creating the first line of the Regional Metro network, later renamed the Réseau Express Régional.

== Transport ==
=== Train ===
The station is served by a train every ten minutes at off-peak time in both directions, and every 15 minutes at late evening and early morning.

=== Bus connections ===
The station is served by several buses:

- RATP Bus:
  - 104 to Maisons-Alfort
  - 308 between Villiers-sur-Marne and Créteil
  - 393 to Thiais
- Marne et Seine: 431 432 433 434 435 436 440 441 443
- Noctilien:
  - N32 between Paris (Gare de Lyon) and Boissy-Saint-Léger

== Gallery ==
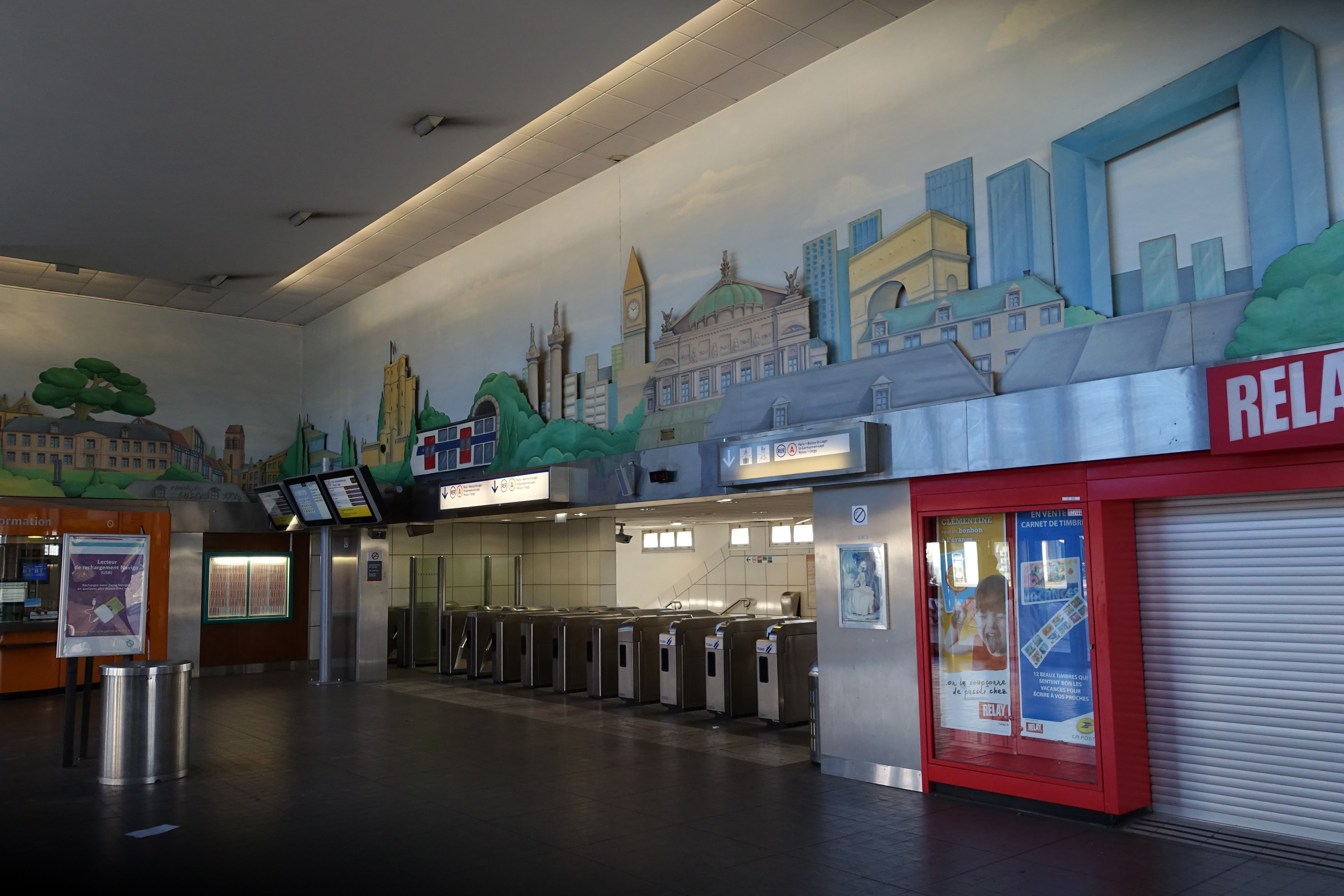
Hall of the station

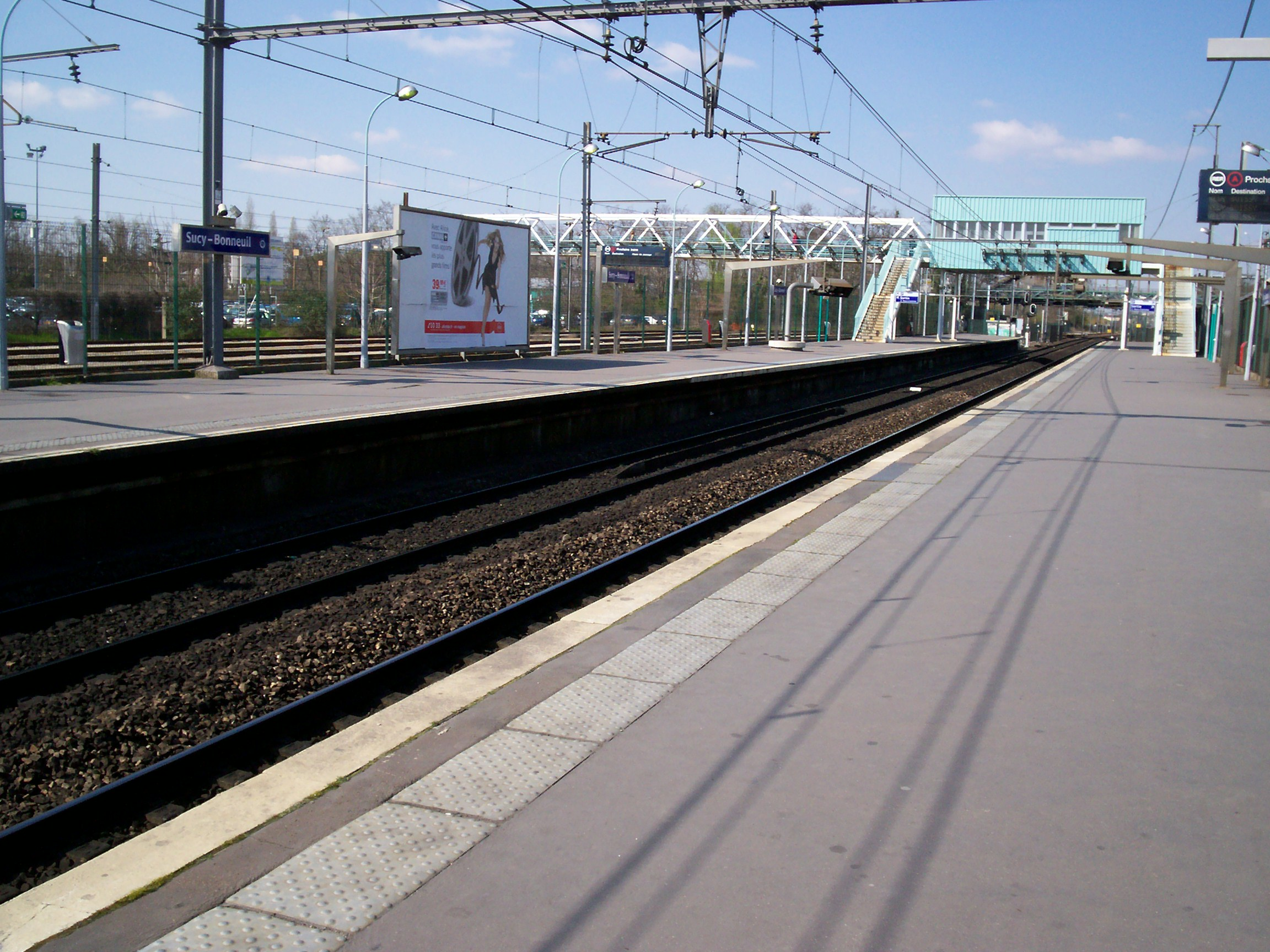
The platform
(bridge in the background)

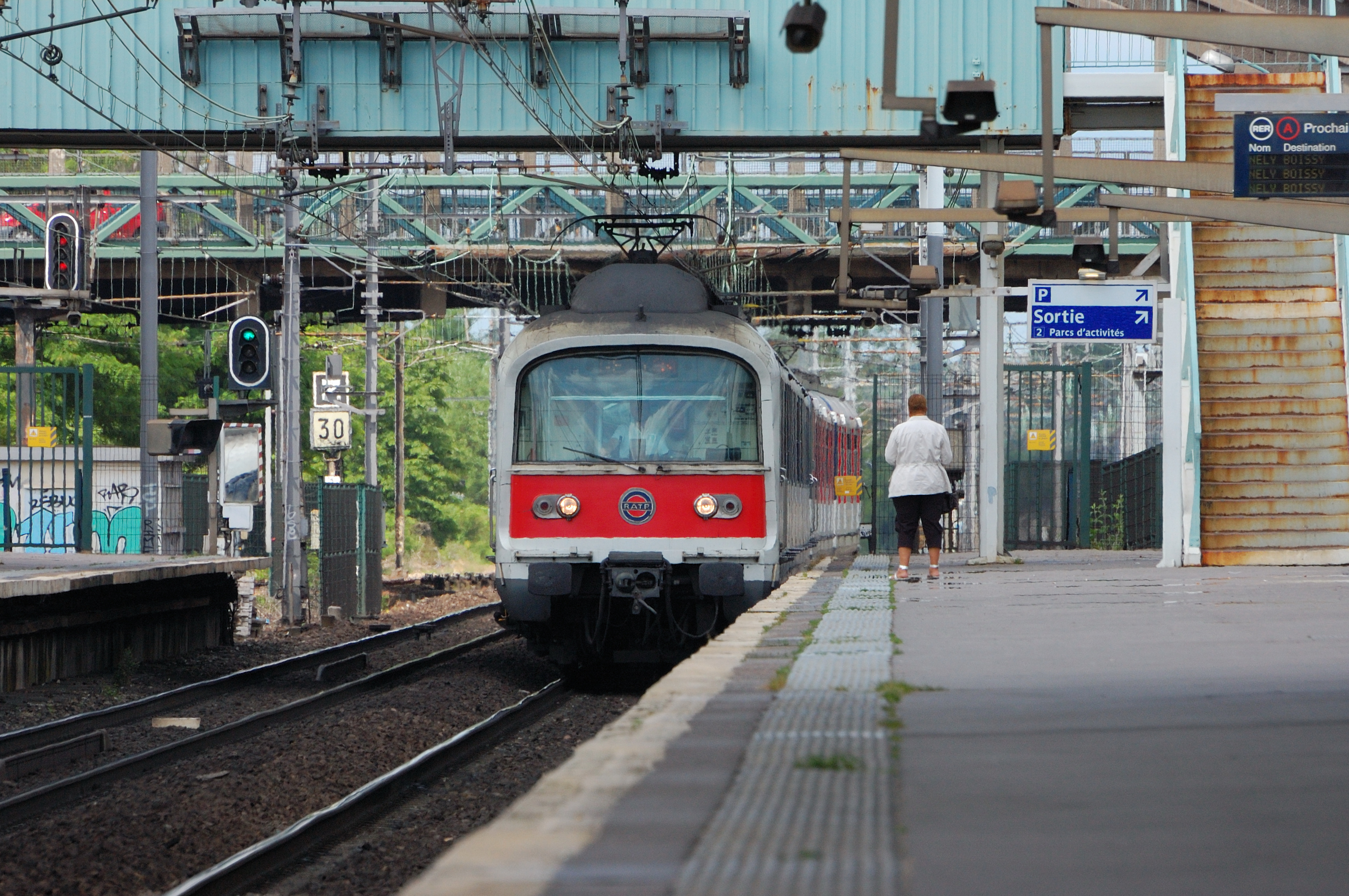
The station served by a MS 61 train (in 2009)

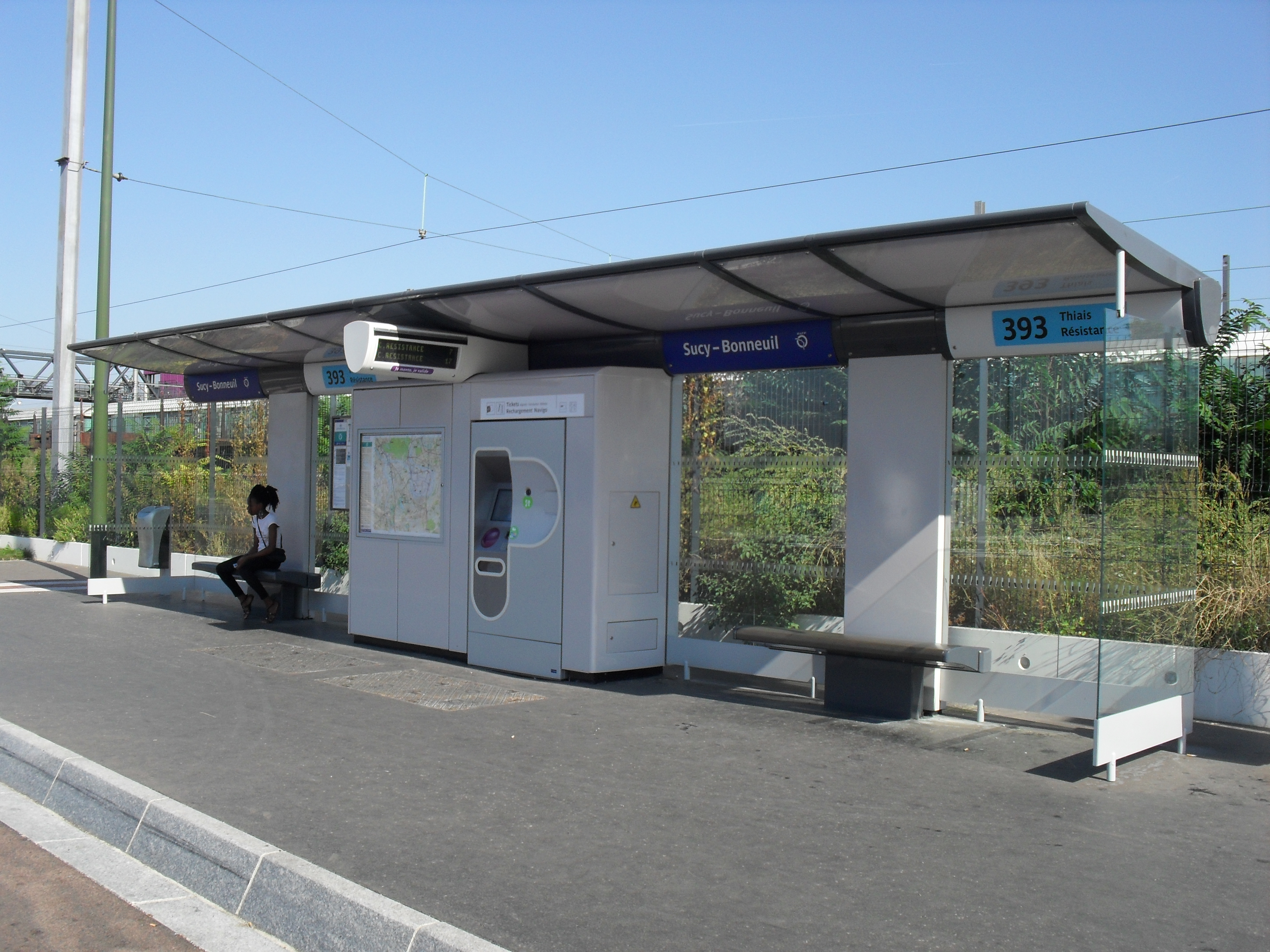
Bus stop of RATP Bus line 393
