= Bonneuil-sur-Marne =

- Commune
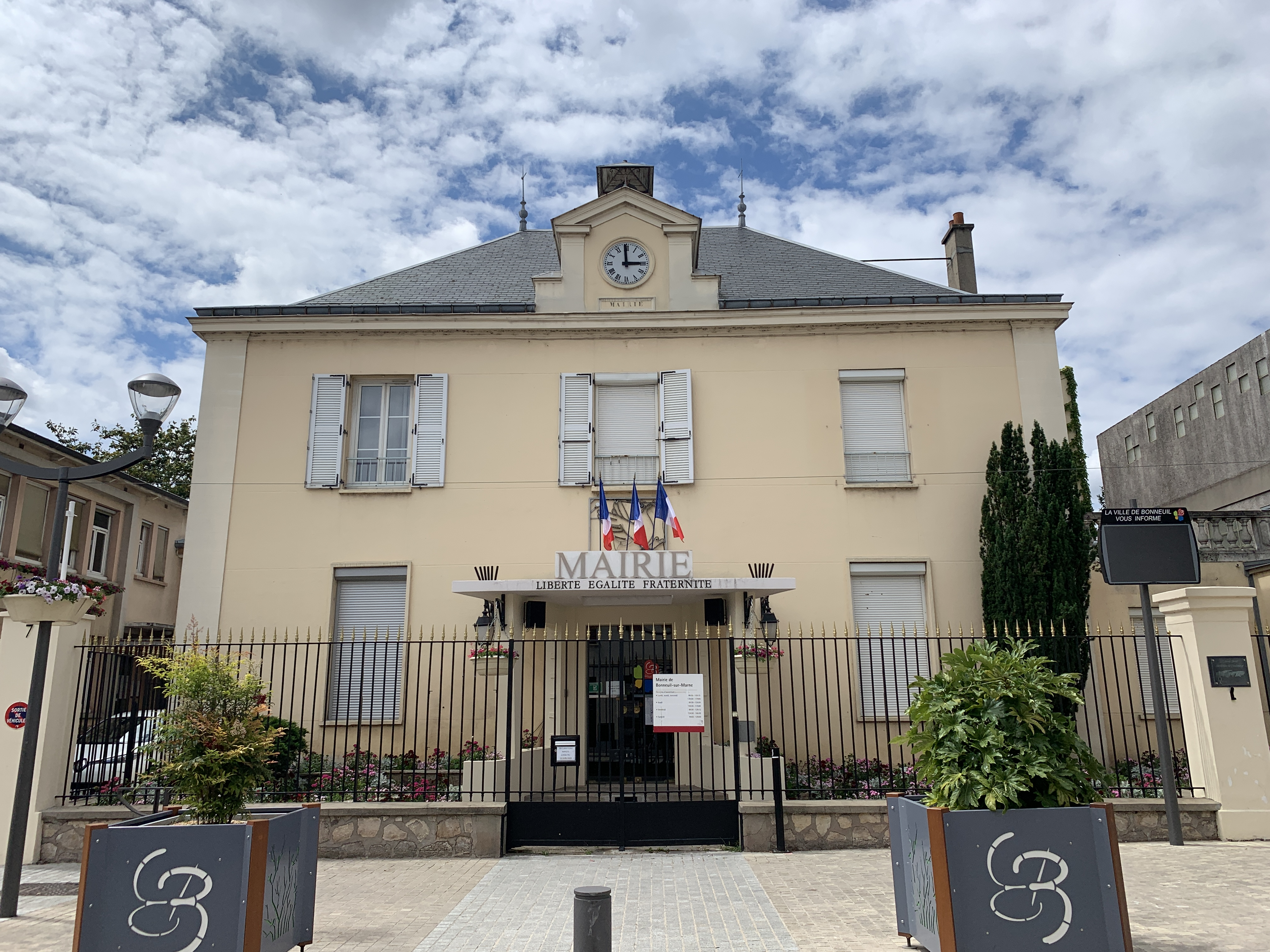
- Town hall

- Coat of arms

- Location (in red) within Paris inner suburbs
- Location of Bonneuil-sur-Marne
- Location within France Location within Île-de-France (region)
- Coordinates: 48°46′27″N 2°29′15″E
- Country: France
- Region: Île-de-France
- Department: Val-de-Marne
- Arrondissement: Créteil
- Canton: Saint-Maur-des-Fossés-2
- Intercommunality: Grand Paris

Government
  - Mayor (2026–32): Denis Öztorun
- Area^{1}: 5.51 km^{2} (2.13 sq mi)
- Highest elevation: 74 m (243 ft)
- Lowest elevation: 32 m (105 ft)
- Population (2023): 18,270
  - Density: 3,320/km^{2} (8,590/sq mi)
- Demonym: Bonneuillois
- Time zone: UTC+01:00 (CET)
  - Summer (DST): UTC+02:00 (CEST)
- INSEE/Postal code: 94011 /
- Website: www.ville-bonneuil.fr
- ^{1} French Land Register data, which excludes lakes, ponds, glaciers > 1 km^{2} (0.386 sq mi or 247 acres) and river estuaries.

Bonneuil-sur-Marne (French pronunciation: [bɔnœj syʁ maʁn]; lit. 'Bonneuil-on-Marne') is a commune in the Val-de-Marne department in the southeastern outer suburbs of Paris, France. It is located 13.4 km (8.3 mi) from the centre of Paris.

== Toponymy ==
Bonneuil perhaps derives from the Latin bona oculus, meaning “good eye”. Eye meaning, in its older sense, “spring” or “water source.” Also, the suffix -uil is common in Gallo-Roman toponyms, and means a place or settlement.

== Population ==
Historical population

Year	Pop.	±% p.a.
1793	172	—
1821	204	+0.61%
1846	310	+1.69%
1872	331	+0.25%
1886	511	+3.15%
1901	674	+1.86%
1906	756	+2.32%
1911	770	+0.37%
1921	1,048	+3.13%
1926	1,364	+5.41%
1931	2,084	+8.85%
1936	2,489	+3.62%

Year	Pop.	±% p.a.
1946	2,582	+0.37%
1954	3,569	+4.13%
1962	7,090	+8.96%
1968	12,317	+9.64%
1975	16,180	+3.97%
1982	14,593	−1.46%
1990	13,626	−0.85%
1999	15,889	+1.72%
2007	16,437	+0.42%
2012	16,439	+0.00%
2017	17,950	+1.77%
2023	18,270	+0.29%

Source: EHESS and INSEE (1968-2023)

== Transport ==
Bonneuil-sur-Marne is served by no station of the Paris Métro, RER, or suburban rail network. The closest station to Bonneuil-sur-Marne is Sucy – Bonneuil station on Paris RER line A. This station is located in the neighboring commune of Sucy-en-Brie, 1.5 km (0.93 mi) from the town center of Bonneuil-sur-Marne.

== Education ==
Schools in the commune include:

- 7 preschools (maternelles): Henri Arlès, Danielle Casanova 1, Danielle Casanova 2, Eugénie Cotton B1, Eugénie Cotton B2, Joliot Curie, Romain Rolland
- 5 elementary schools: Henri Arlès, A & E. Cotton, Langevin- Wallon, Romain Rolland A, and Romain Rolland B

There is also a public junior high school, Collège Paul Eluard, and a private school, Ecole privée Notre Dame.

== See also ==
- Communes of the Val-de-Marne department
