= Yves Castanou =

Veterinary epidemiology

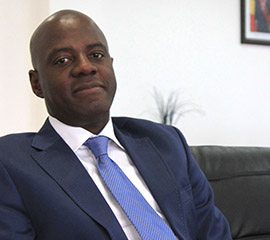
- Yves Castanou
- Born: June 22, 1971 (age 55); Reims, France
- Education: Polytechnique Montréal, Academy of Advanced Theological and Pastoral Studies
- Occupations: Pastor of Impact Christian center Brazzaville and Director general and Agence de régulation des postes et des communications électroniques in Republic of the Congo
- Spouse: Habi Castanou

Yves Castanou (born 22 June 1971) is a French evangelical charismatic Pastor of Impact Christian center Brazzaville and of Director general of Agence de régulation des postes et des communications électroniques in Republic of the Congo.

== Biography ==
Yves Castanou was born in Reims, in France, on June 22, 1971. In 1992, he joined Polytechnique Montréal, where he obtained an electrical engineering degree in 1996. That same year, he married Habi, with whom he has two children. It was at the age of 23 in 1994 that he experienced a new birth. He will then follow a first biblical training in United Kingdom before joining the Biblical Institute and the Academy of Advanced Theological and Pastoral Studies in Paris.

=== Career ===
Yves Castanou was a telecom engineer for Lucent Technologies in Denver in the United States.

In 2002, he founded the church Impact Christian center with Yvan Castanou, his twin brother, in Ivry-sur-Seine, near Paris in France.

He was officially ordained pastor with his wife Habi, in March 2004, by pastors André Thobois and Emmanuel Toussaint (World Protestant and Evangelical Council of Churches).

In 2010, Yves Castanou was appointed, by presidential decree, Director General of the Agency for the Regulation of Posts and Electronic Communications in Republic of the Congo.

In 2012, he became pastor principal of Impact Christian center Brazzaville.

On November 22, 2013, Yves Castanou was elevated to the rank of officer of the Congolese Order of Merit, on the occasion of the inauguration of the new headquarters of ARPCE.
