= Church of St. Peter, Chennevières-sur-Marne =

Roman Catholic church in Chennevières-sur-Marne, Val-de-Marne, France

Church of St. Peter
- French: Église Saint-Pierre de Chennevières-sur-Marne
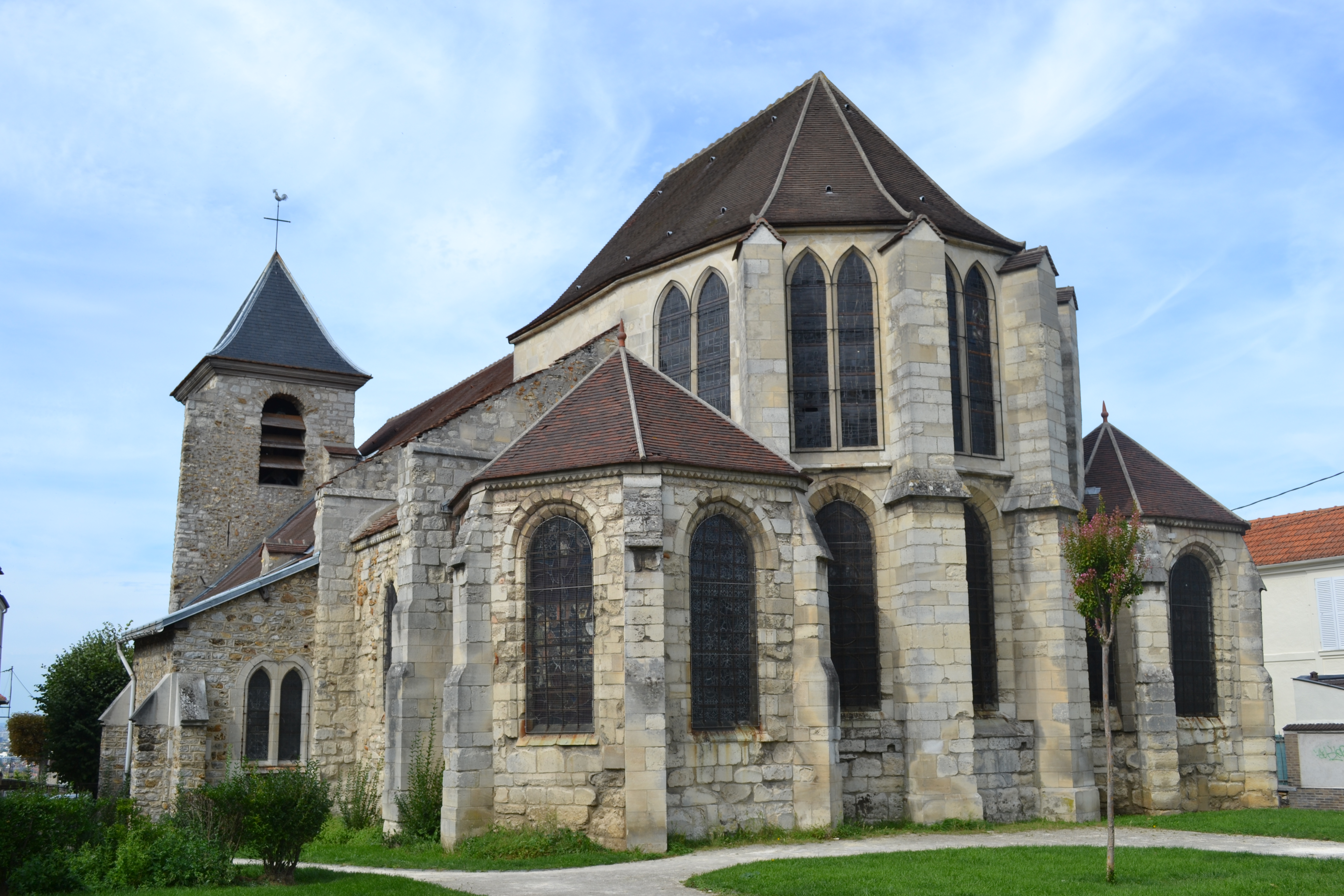

- Location within Paris and the inner ring
- 48°47′42″N 2°31′49″E
- Location: Chennevières-sur-Marne, Val-de-Marne
- Country: France
- Denomination: Roman Catholic

History
- Status: Church
- Dedication: St. Peter

Architecture
- Functional status: Active
- Architectural type: Church

Administration
- Diocese: Créteil

Monument historique
- Official name: Eglise Saint-Pierre
- Criteria: Class MH
- Designated: August 25, 1920
- Reference no.: PA00079863

The Church of St. Peter (French: église Saint-Pierre) is a Roman Catholic church in Chennevières-sur-Marne, Val-de-Marne, France. It is partly listed as a Class Historic Monument.

== History ==
The church belonged to the Abbey of Hiverneau de Lésigny, Essonne. It was mentioned for the first time in 1205.

It was built in the 13th century and used as a priory church in the 14th century. Pits from the construction works were discovered by archaeological excavations near the apse in 2012–3.

A part of the church was listed as a Class Historic Monument in 1920.

== Description ==
The church was built in the Champenois style. It has a nave without transept, and a semi-circular choir with 3 apses. The archaeological works revealed shallow foundations and the presence of tombs on three levels from 14th century to the early 19th century.

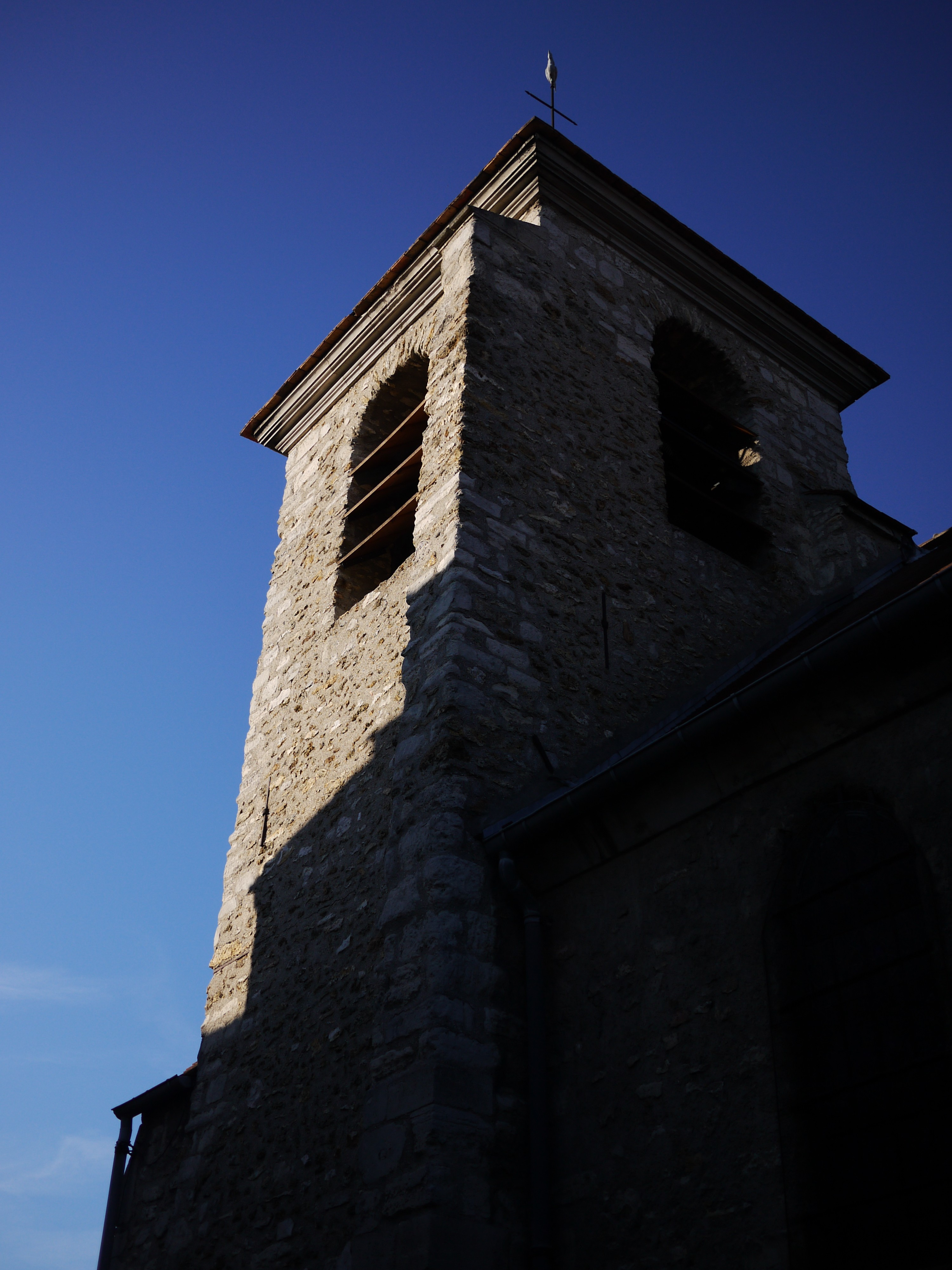

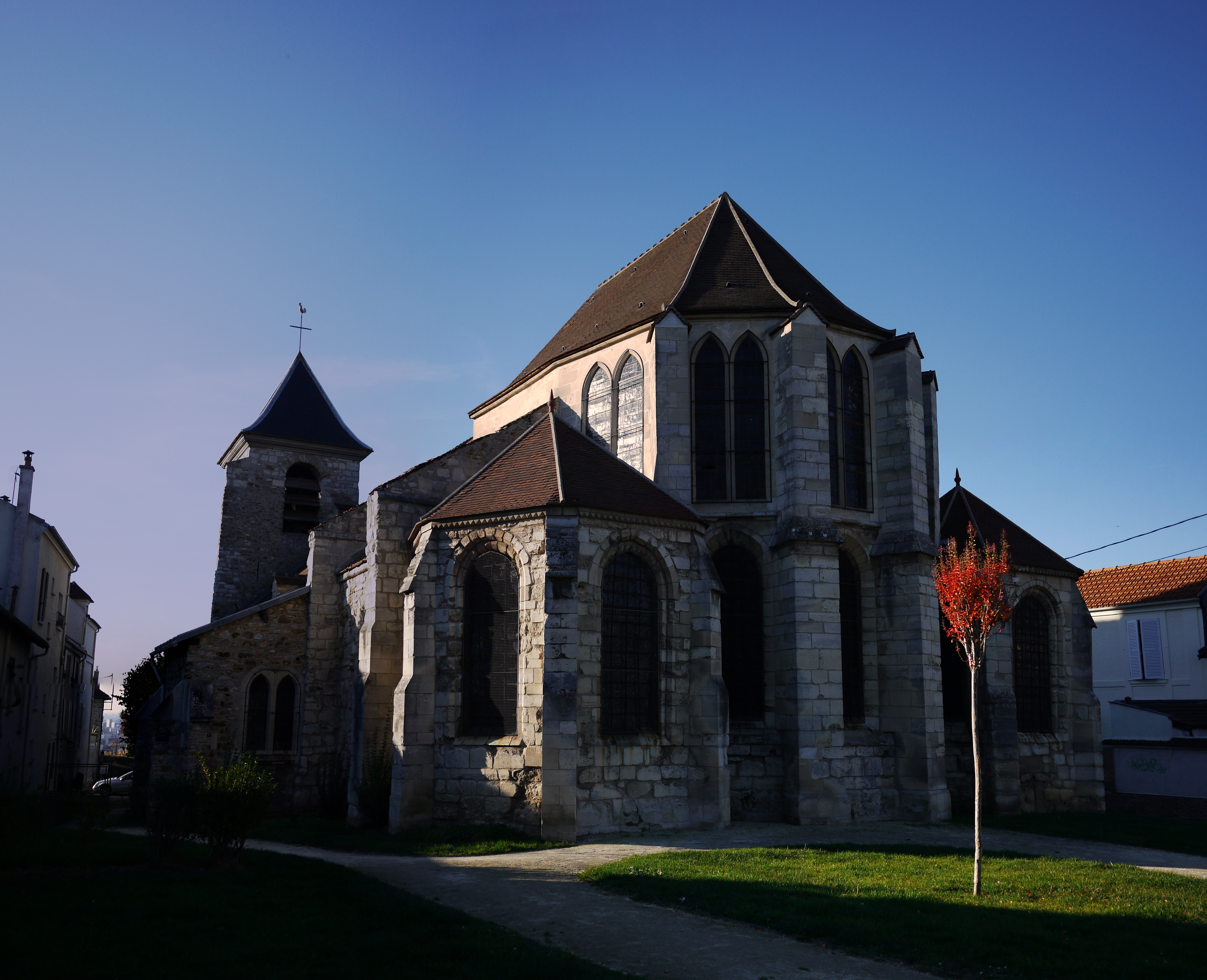

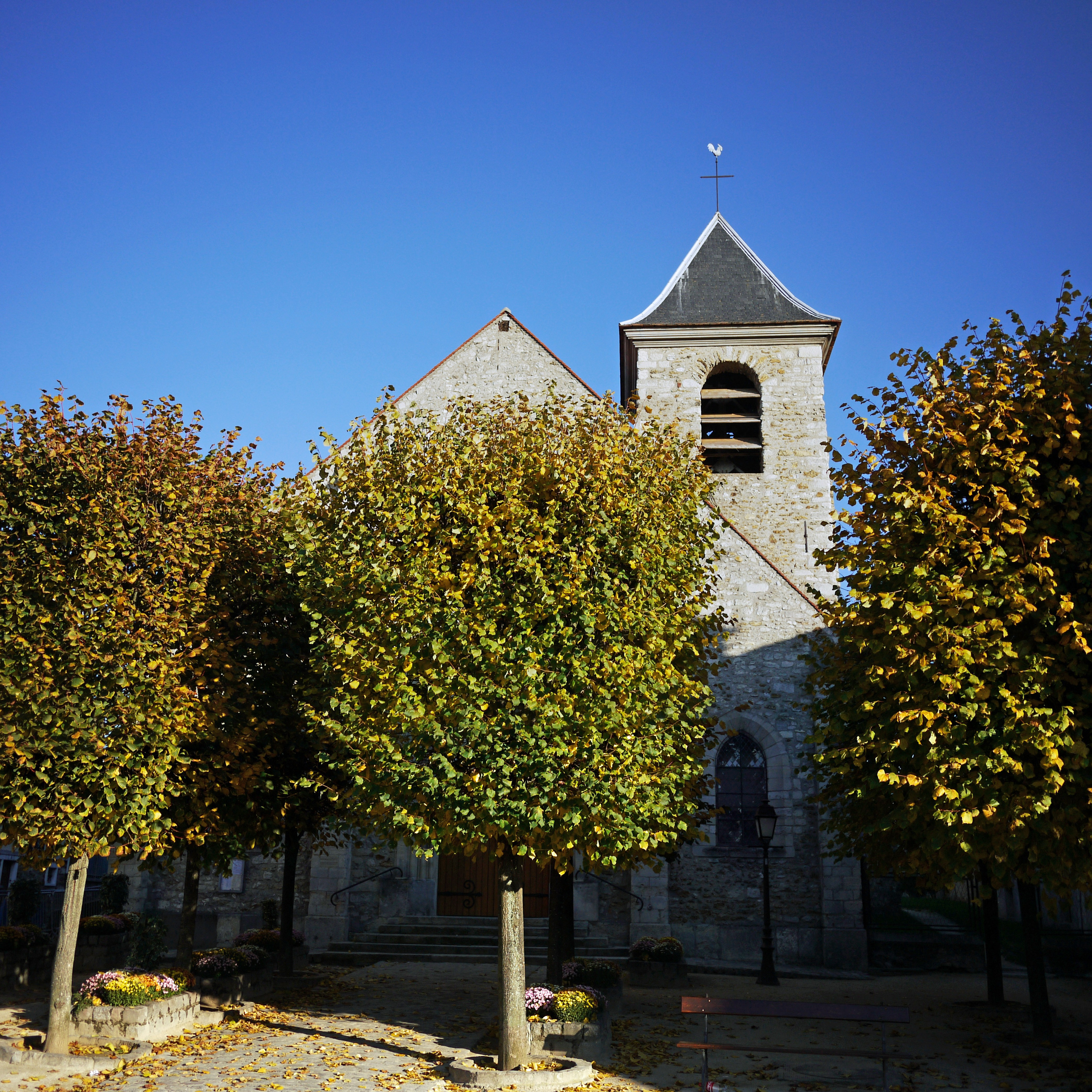
