= Vincennes station =

Railway station in Paris, France

Vincennes
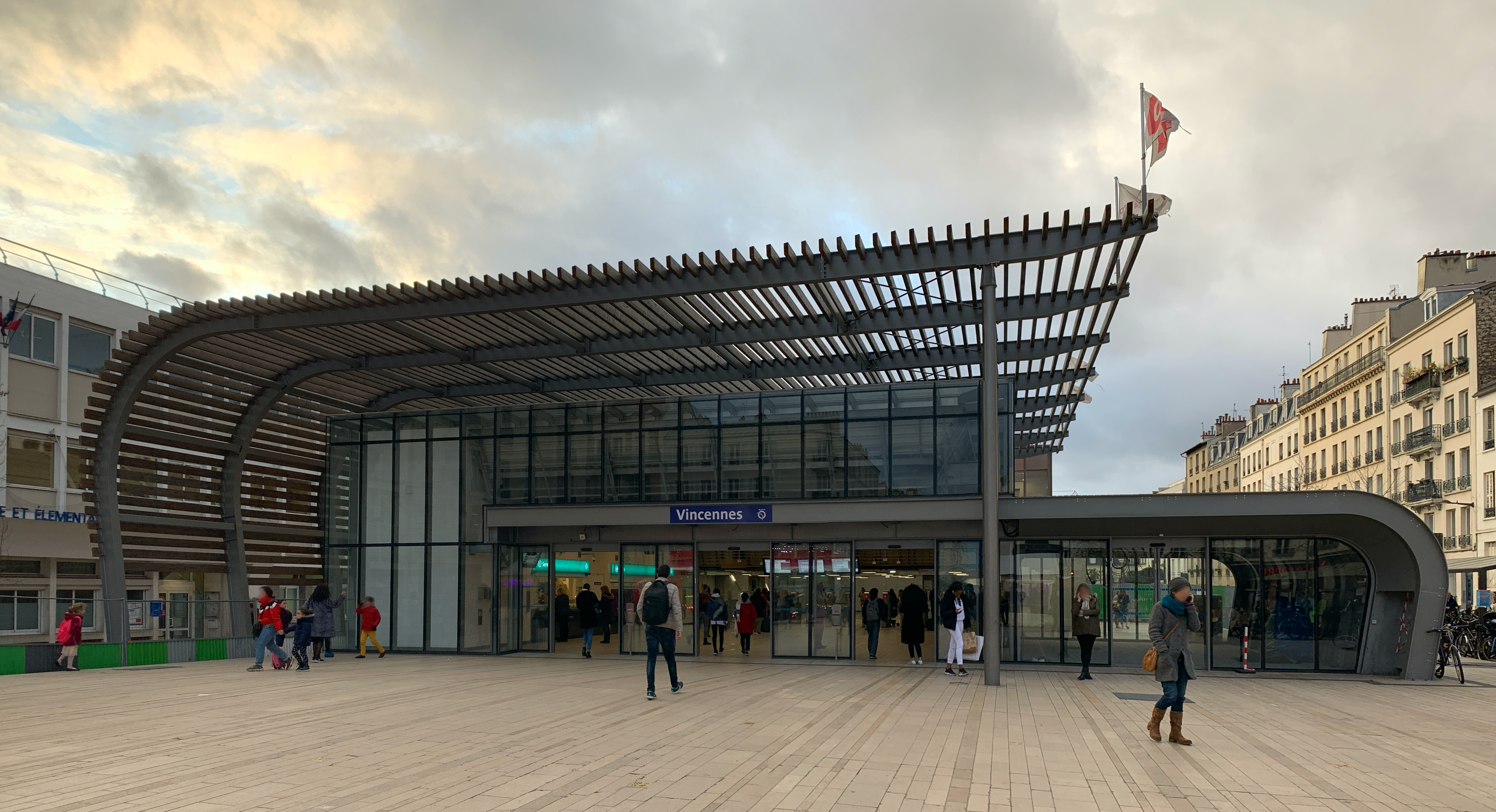
- Vincennes station entrance

General information
- Location: Vincennes; France
- Coordinates: 48°50′51″N 2°26′01″E
- Operator: RATP Group
- Platforms: 2 side platforms
- Tracks: 2
- Connections: RATP Bus: 56 115 118 124 215 318 325; Noctilien: N11 N33

Construction
- Structure type: Below-grade
- Accessible: Yes, by request to staff

Other information
- Station code: 87758110
- Fare zone: 2

History
- Opened: 22 September 1859

Passengers
- 2019: 6,526,978

Services
Preceding station	RER	Following station
Nation towards Saint-Germain-en-Laye, Cergy-le-Haut or Poissy	RER A	Fontenay-sous-Bois towards Boissy-Saint-Léger
Nation towards Saint-Germain-en-Laye, Cergy-le-Haut or Poissy	RER A	Val de Fontenay towards Marne-la-Vallée–Chessy
Location

Vincennes station (French pronunciation: [vɛ̃sɛn]) is a station on RER A the commune of Vincennes, Val-de-Marne.

== Service ==
Vincennes is served by both eastern branches of the RER A line, the A2 towards Boissy-Saint-Léger, and the A4 towards Marne-la-Vallée–Chessy. It is the only station on the RER A in zone 2 and the last before the line splits into the A2 and A4.

== Bus connections ==
The station is served by several buses:

- RATP Bus: 56 , 115 , 118 , 124 , 215 , 318 , 325
- Noctilien: N11, N33
