= Chennevières-sur-Marne =

- Commune
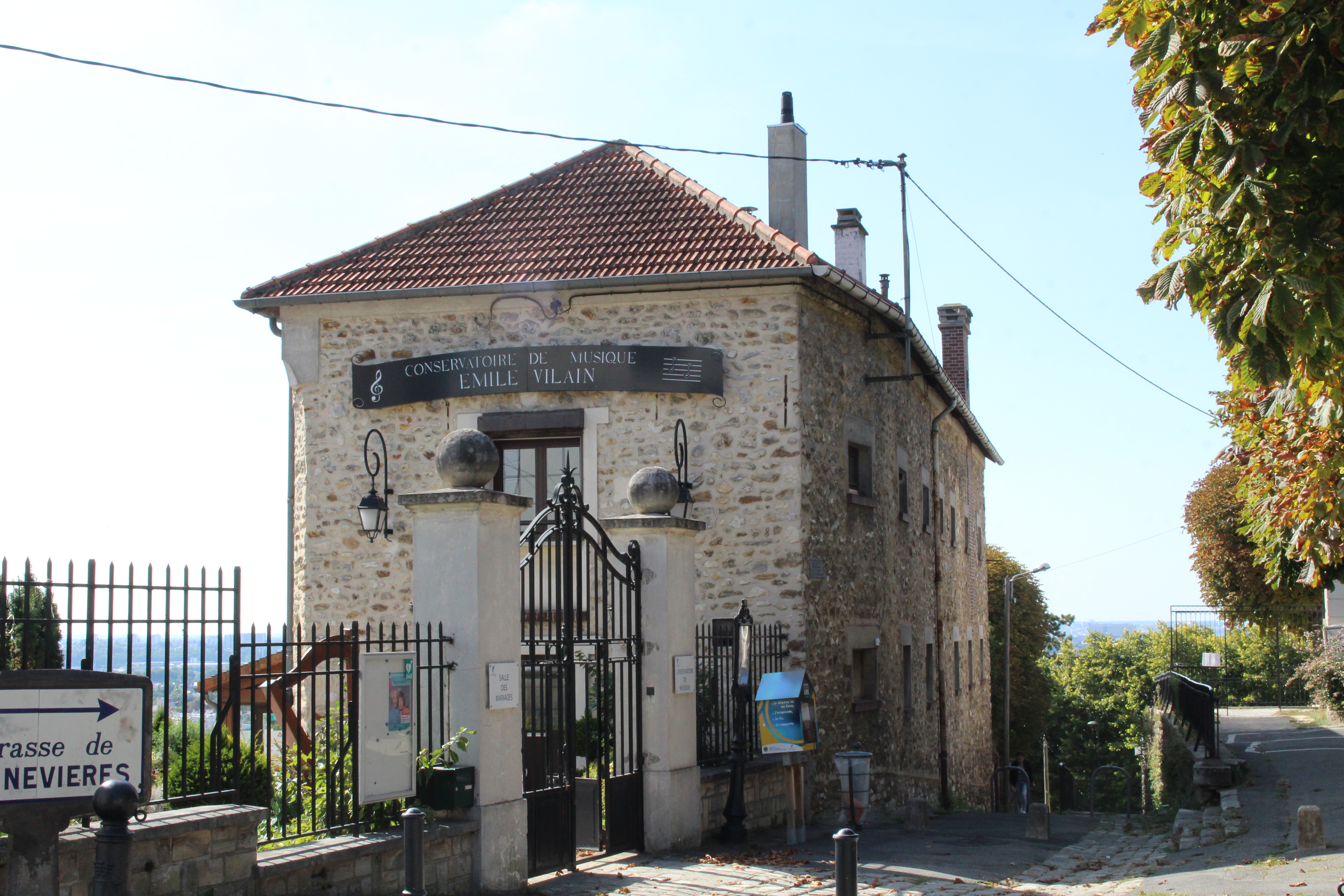
- The music conservatorium in the centre of Chennevières-sur-Marne

- Coat of arms

- Location (in red) within Paris inner suburbs
- Location of Chennevières-sur-Marne
- Location within France Location within Île-de-France (region)
- Coordinates: 48°47′54″N 2°32′02″E
- Country: France
- Region: Île-de-France
- Department: Val-de-Marne
- Arrondissement: Créteil
- Canton: Champigny-sur-Marne-2
- Intercommunality: Grand Paris

Government
  - Mayor (2026–32): Laurence Grandjean
- Area^{1}: 5.27 km^{2} (2.03 sq mi)
- Population (2023): 18,710
  - Density: 3,550/km^{2} (9,200/sq mi)
- Demonym: Canavérois
- Time zone: UTC+01:00 (CET)
  - Summer (DST): UTC+02:00 (CEST)
- INSEE/Postal code: 94019 /94430
- Website: www.chennevieres.com
- ^{1} French Land Register data, which excludes lakes, ponds, glaciers > 1 km^{2} (0.386 sq mi or 247 acres) and river estuaries.

Chennevières-sur-Marne (French pronunciation: [ʃɛn(ə)vjɛʁ syʁ maʁn]; lit. 'Chennevières-on-Marne') or simply Chennevières is a commune in Val-de-Marne in the southeastern suburbs of Paris, France. It is located 14.7 km (9.1 mi) from the centre of Paris.

== History ==
People have lived on the site of Chennevières-sur-Marne since pre-historic times, the hilly, riverside location being an advantageous spot. The Gauls built villages on the site and began planting vineyards there in the fourth century. The city's name is derived from "Canaveria" which stand for the French word for 'hemp', a locally grown product providing material for the fabrication of boat cordage. The town prospered until the Hundred Years' War. Locals harnessed the power of the Marne river to turn a flour mill. The river also served the citizens for transport: a ferry linked Chennevières with the nearby town of La Varenne. A bateau-lavoir – a floating laundry service – was anchored in the river until 1865.

During the Belle Époque, this village, like many of the rural towns surrounding Paris, became an attractive get-away for urban-weary Parisians. One of its restaurants, l'Ecu de France, became a gathering point for artists in particular.

On 7 July 1899, a part of the territory of Chennevières-sur-Marne was detached and merged with a part of the territory of La Queue-en-Brie and a part of the territory of Villiers-sur-Marne to create the commune of Le Plessis-Trévise.

== Transport ==
Chennevières-sur-Marne is served by no station of the Paris Métro, RER, or suburban rail network. The closest station to Chennevières-sur-Marne is La Varenne – Chennevières station on Paris RER line A. This station is located in the neighboring commune of Saint-Maur-des-Fossés, 1.4 km (0.87 mi) from the town center of Chennevières-sur-Marne. Four bus lines provide service to the city: the RATP lines 208 and 308 as well as the Transdev lines 09 and 08.

== Population ==
Historical population
Year	Pop.	±% p.a.
1968	7,016	—
1975	17,561	+14.00%
1982	17,417	−0.12%
1990	17,857	+0.31%
1999	17,837	−0.01%
2007	17,313	−0.37%
2012	18,304	+1.12%
2017	18,321	+0.02%
2023	18,710	+0.35%
Source: INSEE

== Education ==
Primary schools include:

- Seven preschools
- Six elementary schools

Secondary schools include:

- Junior high schools: Collège Boileau and Collège Molière
- Senior high schools: Lycée Samuel de Champlain

== Monuments ==
- The Church of St. Peter

== Personalities ==
- Needy Guims, athlete

== See also ==
- Communes of the Val-de-Marne department
