= Boissy-Saint-Léger =

- Commune
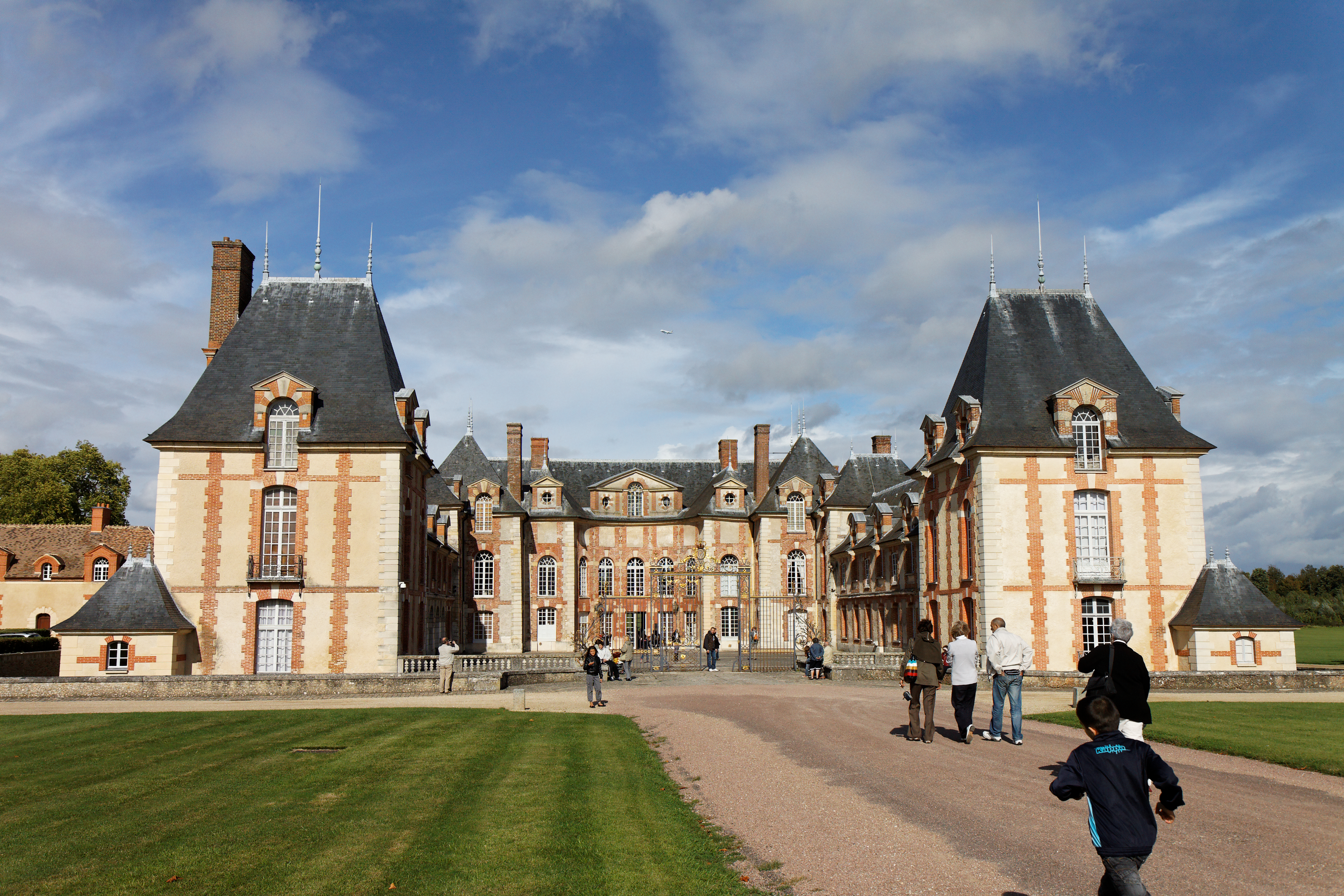
- The château de Grosbois, listed as an historical monument

- Coat of arms

- Location (in red) within Paris inner suburbs
- Location of Boissy-Saint-Léger
- Location within France Location within Île-de-France (region)
- Coordinates: 48°45′04″N 2°30′38″E
- Country: France
- Region: Île-de-France
- Department: Val-de-Marne
- Arrondissement: Créteil
- Canton: Plateau briard
- Intercommunality: Grand Paris

Government
  - Mayor (2026–32): Régis Charbonnier
- Area^{1}: 8.94 km^{2} (3.45 sq mi)
- Highest elevation: 102 m (335 ft)
- Lowest elevation: 37 m (121 ft)
- Population (2023): 17,325
  - Density: 1,940/km^{2} (5,020/sq mi)
- Time zone: UTC+01:00 (CET)
  - Summer (DST): UTC+02:00 (CEST)
- INSEE/Postal code: 94004 /94470
- ^{1} French Land Register data, which excludes lakes, ponds, glaciers > 1 km^{2} (0.386 sq mi or 247 acres) and river estuaries.

Boissy-Saint-Léger (French pronunciation: [bwasi sɛ̃ leʒe]) is a commune in the Val-de-Marne department in the southeastern suburbs of Paris, France. It is located 16.9 km (10.5 mi) from the center of Paris.

== Toponymy ==
Boissy is believed to derive from a Gallo-Roman personal name Botius or Bodicius. Boissy was likely an estate belonging to a person of that name. Saint-Léger refers to Saint Léger d’Autun, a 7th century bishop and martyr.

== Population ==
Historical population

Year	Pop.	±% p.a.
1793	370	—
1821	506	+1.12%
1846	609	+0.74%
1872	764	+0.88%
1881	846	+1.14%
1891	961	+1.28%
1896	1,088	+2.51%
1901	1,149	+1.10%
1906	1,201	+0.89%
1911	1,109	−1.58%
1921	1,250	+1.20%
1926	1,754	+7.01%
1931	2,537	+7.66%

Year	Pop.	±% p.a.
1936	2,599	+0.48%
1946	2,640	+0.16%
1954	3,199	+2.43%
1962	4,146	+3.29%
1968	5,128	+3.61%
1975	9,372	+9.00%
1982	12,733	+4.48%
1990	15,120	+2.17%
1999	15,289	+0.12%
2007	15,894	+0.49%
2012	16,483	+0.73%
2017	16,345	−0.17%
2023	17,325	+0.98%

Source: EHESS and INSEE (1968-2023)

== Transport ==
Boissy-Saint-Léger is served by Boissy-Saint-Léger station on Paris RER line A. The station is the line's terminus.

== Education ==
Public schools in the commune:

- 7 preschools
- 7 elementary schools
- Two junior high schools (collèges): Amédée Dunois and Blaise Cendrars
- Two senior high schools: Lycée Gillaume Budé and Lycée Christoph Colombe

Private schools:

- Lycée Bernard-Palissy (junior and senior high school)
- École des Sacrés-Cœurs (preschool and primary school)

== See also ==
- Communes of the Val-de-Marne department
