= Boissy-Saint-Léger station =

Railway station in Boissy-Saint-Léger, France

Boissy-Saint-Léger
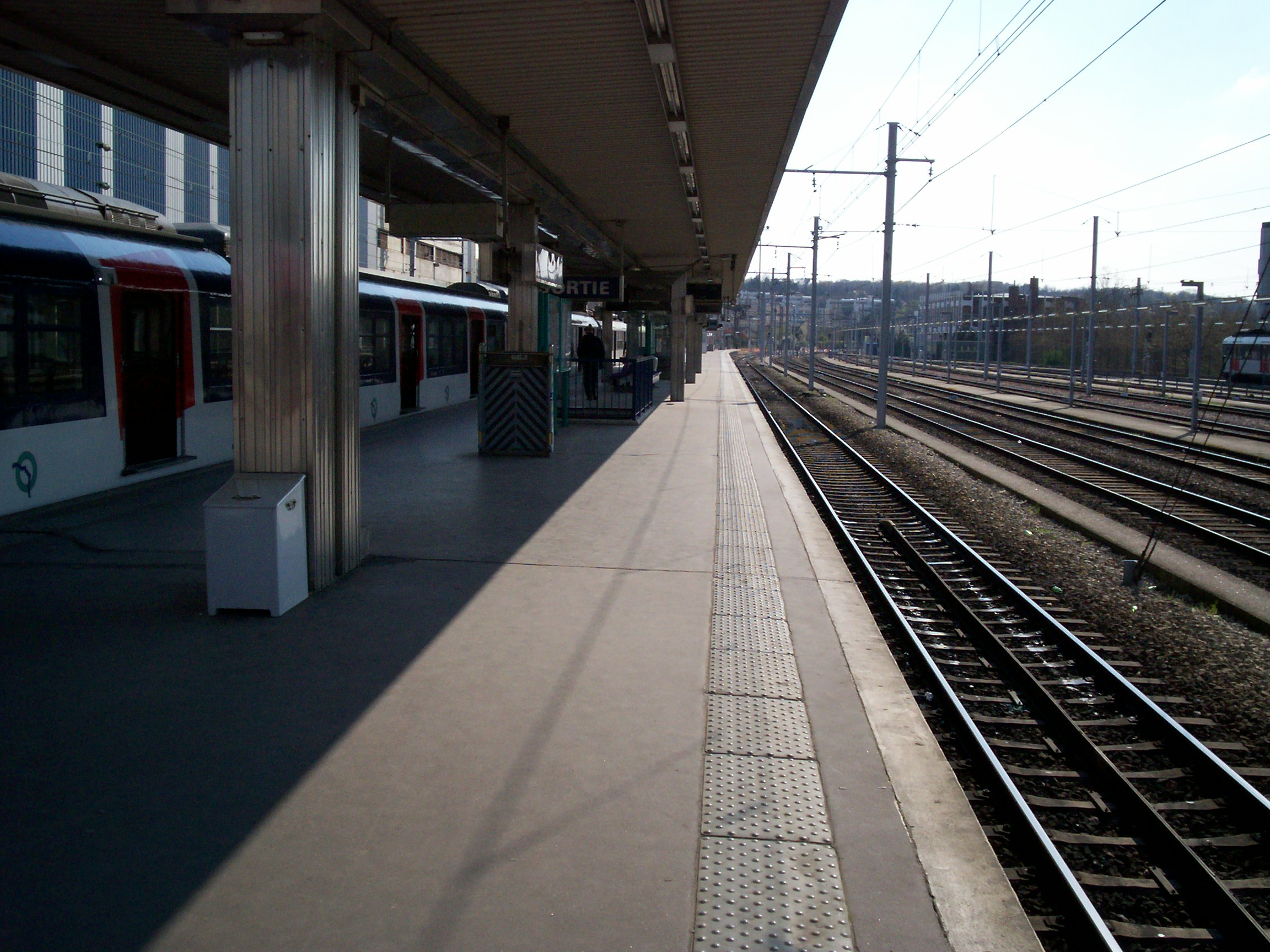
- Boissy-Saint-Léger station platform

General information
- Location: Boulevard de la Gare; Boissy-Saint-Léger; France
- Coordinates: 48°45′11″N 2°30′18″E
- Operator: RATP Group
- Line: Ligne de Vincennes
- Platforms: 1 island platform 1 side platform
- Tracks: 3 + 7 storage tracks
- Connections: Situs: 5, 6; Setra: 12, 21, 23; Strav: J1, J2; Noctilien: N32

Construction
- Structure type: At-grade
- Parking: 409 spaces
- Cycle facilities: Véligo parking station
- Accessible: Yes, by request to staff

Other information
- Station code: 87758201
- Fare zone: 4

History
- Opened: 8 July 1874

Services
Preceding station	RER	Following station
Sucy–Bonneuil towards Saint-Germain-en-Laye	RER A	Terminus
Location

Boissy-Saint-Léger station is a railway station in Boissy-Saint-Léger, an eastern suburb of Paris, France. It is one of the terminuses of the RER A trains.

== Transport ==
=== Train ===
Since 10 December 2017, the station is served (both departure and arrival) by:

- on off-peak hours: a train every 8 to 12 minutes (from Monday to Friday) or every 10 minutes (on weekends and public holidays)
- on peak hours: a train every 4 to 7 minutes (about ten trains per hour) during school days or a train every 6 minutes in summer and during school holidays
- in the evening, all year round: a train every 15 minutes.

=== Bus connections ===
The station is served by several bus lines:

- Situs: 5, 6
- Setra: 12, 21, 23
- Strav: J1, J2
- Noctilien: N32
