= IONISx =

Educational technology company that offers massive open online courses

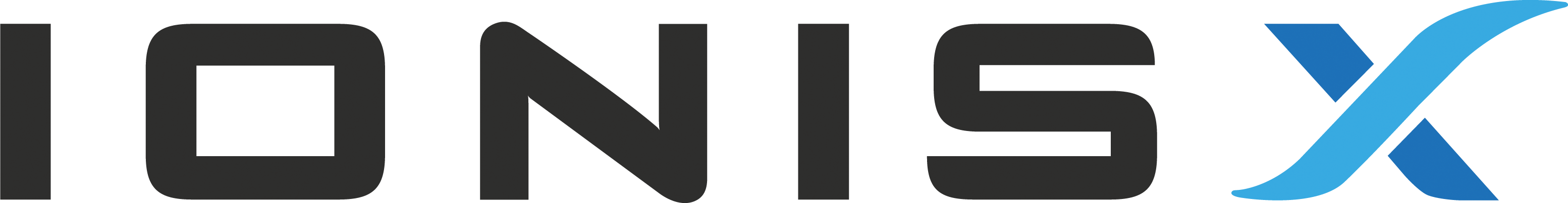
- Website type: Online education
- Available in: French
- Headquarters: Paris, France
- Founder: IONIS Education Group
- Key people: Marc Sellam (CEO)
- Website: ionisx.com
- Commercial: Yes
- Registration: Required
- Launched: September 2013; 13 years ago
- Current status: Active

IONISx is a for-profit, educational technology company that offers massive open online courses (MOOCs) as well as online degrees and certifications.

== History ==
IONISx was established in 2013, in collaboration with ISG Business School, ISEFAC Bachelor, EPITA, Epitech, IPSA, E-Artsup, Sup'Internet and ETNA.

IONISx works with universities and other organizations to make some of their courses available online.
