= IONIS School of Technology and Management =

French private graduate school

Coordinates: 48.8153°N 2.3632°E

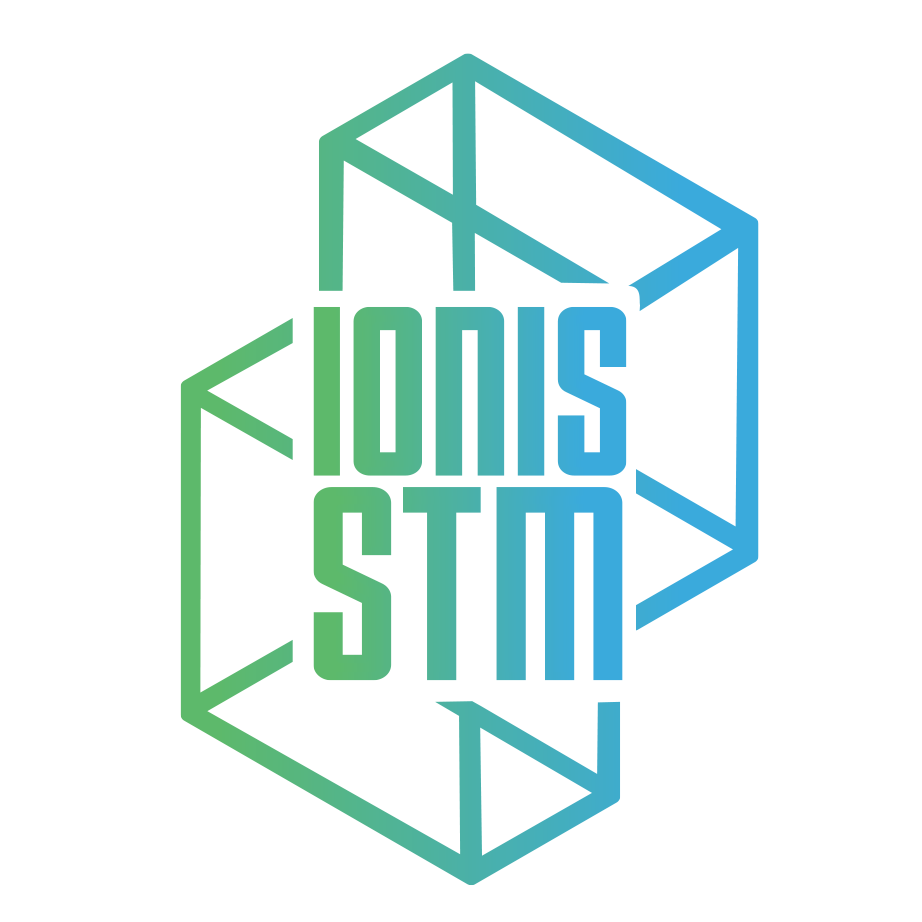
- Former name: Mastères EPITA (2002–2009)
- Type: Private
- Established: 2002; 24 years ago
- Affiliations: IONIS Education Group
- Director: Guillaume Bardèche
- Location: 24 rue Pasteur, Le Kremlin-Bicêtre, Val-de-Marne, Île-de-France, France
- Campus: Urban
- Website: www.ionis-stm.com

IONIS School of Technology and Management (IONIS-STM) is a French private higher education institution and a member of the IONIS Education Group. It offers postgraduate programmes that combine management training with a technical field: biotechnology, energy, computer science and digital technologies. The school traces its origins to specialised programmes created by EPITA in 2002 and became an independent school in 2009.

The school is registered with the Rectorat de Créteil as a private higher education establishment. Since September 2026 it has been based on the IONIS campus in Le Kremlin-Bicêtre, south of Paris, which it shares with EPITA and Epitech.

== History ==
=== Origins ===
In 2002, EPITA, a computer engineering school belonging to the IONIS group, created a set of specialised postgraduate programmes known as Mastères EPITA. In 2009 these programmes were spun off into a standalone institution, IONIS School of Technology and Management, which extended the model to other sectors such as biotechnology and energy. The same year, three of the school's MBA programmes were registered with the French Répertoire national des certifications professionnelles (RNCP).

=== From MBA to MSc ===
In 2018 the school offered 18 MBA programmes across four areas: digital, computer science, biotechnology and energy. That year Cécile Frankart, who had joined the school in 2005 and served as director of studies from 2011, was appointed director. The programmes were later reorganised as Master of Science (MSc) degrees; by 2026 the school offered four MSc programmes with twelve specialisations. The school is currently directed by Guillaume Bardèche, previously founder of IONIS 361, the group's incubator, and head of executive education at Epitech.

=== Locations ===
The school was originally based in Le Kremlin-Bicêtre, then moved to Ivry-sur-Seine and later to the 15th arrondissement of Paris, on rue du Docteur-Roux near the Pasteur Institute. In September 2026 it returned to Le Kremlin-Bicêtre, settling at 24 rue Pasteur alongside EPITA and Epitech.

== Programmes ==
=== Master of Science ===
IONIS-STM offers four MSc programmes, each organised into a common first year followed by a choice of three specialisations in the second year. They can be taken as full-time study or through apprenticeship (alternance), alternating between school and a company.

Programme	Second-year specialisations	Partner schools
Biotechnology & Management	Quality and Bioproduction; Innovation and Development; Biotechnology Marketing	Sup'Biotech, ISG
Energy & Management	Optimisation and Energy Efficiency; Business and Strategy; Engineering and Development	ESME, ISG
Computer Science & Management	AI and Management; Cybersecurity Management; Cloud Engineering and Management	EPITA, ISG
Digital & Management	Data Analytics; Digital Marketing; Digital Transformation	EPITA, ISG

The programmes lead to a RNCP level 7 certification, equivalent to five years of higher education.

=== Continuing education ===
For working professionals, the school runs the Executive MBA Epitech by Ionis-STM, with two specialisations (Digital Transformation and Management; Strategy, Innovation and IT Management), leading to the RNCP level 7 title Expert en management des systèmes d'information. It also offers a training programme in instructional design and access to qualifications through validation of prior experience (VAE).

== Admissions and fees ==
The MSc programmes admit students who have completed two to five years of higher education after the baccalauréat. Applicants with two or three years of study enter through a preparatory year (Pré-MSc), and an intensive track starting in January is open to holders of four- or five-year degrees. Admission is based on an application file followed by an interview.

For 2026, annual tuition was €9,600 for the first MSc year and €9,000 for the second, plus a €990 registration fee. For apprenticeship students, tuition is paid by the employer through its OPCO.

== Rankings and recognition ==
In the 2026 Eduniversal Meilleurs Masters rankings, the MSc Energy & Management was ranked 16th in the renewable energy category and the MSc Digital & Management 25th in the digital marketing and data analytics category. The school holds the Qualiopi quality certification for training, apprenticeship and VAE. It has received the HappyAtSchool label awarded by ChooseMyCompany on the basis of student surveys, placing in the top three of the ranking in 2020.

== Student life ==
Student associations include a students' union (bureau des élèves), a sports association and Human-STM, a charitable association. Students take part in group-wide campaigns such as blood drives with the Établissement français du sang and AIDS awareness events with Sidaction and AIDES. Graduates are connected through an alumni network and a job board run on JobTeaser.

== Publications ==
The school coordinated a collective book on the "double competence" model, La double compétence : l'antidote à l'obsolescence professionnelle, published by FYP Éditions with contributions from 17 specialists.

== See also ==
- IONIS Education Group
- École pour l'informatique et les techniques avancées
- Epitech
