= École des technologies numériques avancées =

French private school of computer science

Coordinates: 48°48′49″N 2°23′34″E

- Motto: The new dual education system in computer science
- Type: Private
- Established: 2005
- Founder: Marc Sellam
- Affiliations: IONIS Education Group
- President: Samir Rinaz
- Students: 250
- Location: Ivry-sur-Seine, France
- Website: https://www.etna.io

The École des technologies numériques avancées (ETNA) is a French private school of computer science localized at Ivry-sur-Seine. Created in 2005 by Patrice Dumoucel, the school has been part of IONIS Education Group since 2006. The certification delivered by the school are recognized by the French state.

The school is from the same group as EPITA and EPITECH. The partnership ETNA/EPITA/EPITECH allows students to use the equipment to the two other universities. ETNA graduates can proceed to others courses at the IONIS School of Technology and Management or an MBA at the Institut supérieur de gestion.

== Curriculum ==
The course is a three-year dual education system and includes 200 hours of lessons and 400 hours of practical cases study per year. Two specializations are available: software development or system and computer network.

Students choose one of these two in the second year.

The main lessons of the first year of study offers the following subjects: management, database, IPv4 network, web technologies, system administration, PHP / web, culture computer, English, mathematics and method. The second year can address the following topics: project, business valuation, English, mathematics, drafting and document analysis, and marketing / business / management. During the last year, the curriculum includes the subjects: project, English, mathematics, drafting and document analysis, marketing / business / management and psychology work.

Since September 2013, the school will start a new program in 2 years after French Baccalauréat which will be entirely free. 250 tickets are available. The innovation is that there are graduate students who will pay for the students in training (250 euros per month during three years).
