= Institut supérieur européen de gestion group =

Coordinates: 48°51′28.753″N 2°21′36.603″E

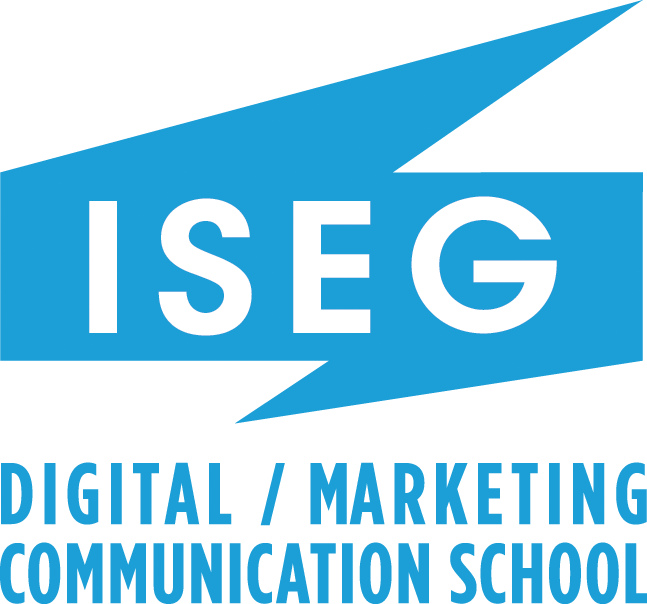
- Type: for profit
- Established: 1980
- Affiliations: IONIS Education Group IACBE, ACBSP
- President: Adrienne Jablanczy
- Students: 1,100 (in 2009)
- Location: Paris, Bordeaux, Lille, Lyon, Nantes, Strasbourg and Toulouse, France
- Campus: Urban
- Website: http://www.iseg.fr

The Institut supérieur européen de gestion group (ISEG group, French for Advanced European Institute of Management) is a group of two business schools, ISEG Marketing & Communication School and ISG Programme Business & Management, the former created in 1980, and the latter formed in 2014 when ISEG Business School and ISEG Finance School, each also founded in 1980, merged. In September 2017, ISEG Business & Finance School merged with the programme Business & Management of the ISG Business School. It is based in Paris, Bordeaux, Lille, Lyon, Nantes, Strasbourg and Toulouse, France. The group is mainly focused on teaching entrepreneurship.

== History ==
=== Deployment in regions ===
The Institut supérieur européen de gestion was created in 1980 in Paris. Since then, six other campuses have been opened in Bordeaux (1986), Toulouse (1987), Lille (1988), Nantes (1989), Strasbourg (1989) and Lyon (1990).

=== Extending the duration of studies ===
In 1990, new curriculums for the fourth and fifth years after the Baccalauréat were introduced. In 1996, ISEG Paris moved to its new building, Rue des Francs-Bourgeois. In 1997, ISEG Bordeaux inaugurated a new campus. The concours PRISM (PRISM competitive examination) was launched in 2001, one year before new five-year curriculums were introduced. In 2003/2004, new buildings were inaugurated in Paris, Bordeaux, Lyon and Toulouse, and in Strasbourg in 2007.

=== A group of three autonomous universities ===
In 2010, the creation of ISEG Group brought together three autonomous universities. The three universities have a degree recognized level 1 by CNCP and are members of AACSB.

In September 2014, a new digital and innovative campus will open in Paris (Le Marais-Bastille) bringing together the group, Sup'Internet and E-Artsup.

=== Merger ===
In September 2014, ISEG Business School and ISEG Finance School merged to create a new school named ISEG Business & Finance School. In September 2017, ISEG Business & Finance School merged with the programme Business & Management of the ISG Business School.
