= Online learning community =

Peer-to-peer social networking groups

An online learning community is a public or private destination on the Internet that addresses its members' learning needs by facilitating peer-to-peer learning. Through social networking and computer-mediated communication, or the use of datagogies while people work as a community to achieve a shared learning objective. The community owner may propose learning objectives or may arise out of discussions between participants that reflect personal interests. In an online learning community, people share knowledge via textual discussion (synchronous or asynchronous), audio, video, or other Internet-supported media. Blogs blend personal journaling with social networking to create environments with opportunities for reflection.

According to Etienne Wenger, online learning communities are environments conducive to communities of practice.

== Categories ==
Types of online learning communities include e-learning communities (groups interact and connect solely via technology) and blended learning communities (groups utilize face-to-face meetings as well as online meetings). Based on Riel and Polin (2004), intentional online learning communities may be categorized as knowledge-based, practice-based, and task-based. Online learning communities may focus on personal aspects, process, or technology. They may use technology and tools in many categories:

- synchronous (such as instant messaging or language exchange websites and mobile applications
- asynchronous (such as message boards and Internet forums)
- blogs
- course management
- collaborative (such as wikis)
- social networking
- social learning
- online university
- skills and language exchange platforms

== List of online learning communities ==
- Alison
- Codewars
- Coursera
- Curriki
- edX
- freeCodeCamp
- FutureLearn
- France université numérique (FUN)
- iversity
- Kadenze
- Khan Academy
- LinkedIn Learning
- MIT OpenCourseWare
- OpenLearning
- Peer 2 Peer University
- Quora
- Reddit
- Skillshare
- Stack Exchange — Stack Overflow
- SWAYAM
- Udacity
- Udemy
- Wikimedia — Wikipedia, Wikiversity, Wiktionary, Wikibooks, WikiEducator, and more.

== See also ==
- Community language learning
- Community of practice
- List of online educational resources
- List of (MOOC) Massive Open Online Course providers
- Massive open online course
- University of the People
- Virtual education
- Virtual world language learning

== Bibliography ==
- Barab, S. & Duffy, T. (2000). "From Practice Fields to Communities of Practice". In D. Jonassen & S. Land (eds.). Theoretical Foundations of Learning Environments (PDF). LEA. Archived from the original (PDF) on 2014-12-17.
- Bryant, S. L.; Forte, A. & Bruckman, A. (2005). Becoming Wikipedian: transformation of participation in a collaborative online encyclopedia. Conference on Supporting Group Work. Proceedings of the 2005 international ACM SIGGROUP conference on Supporting group work. Florida. doi:10.1145/1099203.1099205.
- Hill, J.; Raven A. (October 10, 2000). "ITFORUM PAPER #46 - Online Learning Communities: If You Build Them, Will They Stay?". ITFORUM. Archived from the original on October 27, 2000.
- Kaplan, S. (2002). "Building Communities – Strategies for Collaborative Learning". ASTD's Source for E-Learning. Archived from the original on August 23, 2010.
- Resta, P. & LaFerriere, T. (2007). "Technology in Support of Collaborative Learning". Educational Psychology Review. 19: 65–83. doi:10.1007/s10648-007-9042-7. S2CID 2328138.
- Riel, M. & Polin, L. (2004). "Designing for virtual communities in the service of learning". In Barab, R. Kling & J. Gray H. (eds.). Online learning communities: Common ground and critical differences in designing technical environments. Cambridge: Cambridge University Press. pp. 16–50.
