= Iversity =

Berlin-based online education platform

- Website type: Online education
- Available in: English, German and Russian
- Creators: Jonas Liepmann and Hannes Klöpper
- Website: www.iversity.org
- Commercial: Yes
- Registration: Required
- Users: 600.000+ (February 2015)
- Launched: October 2013; 13 years ago
- Current status: Active

Iversity (stylised as "iversity") is a Berlin-based online education platform. Since October 2013, iversity has specialised in providing online courses and lectures in higher education, specifically MOOCs (Massive Open Online Courses). Courses are free and open for anyone to enroll and participate. Many of them are conducted in English or German, but also in other languages. iversity cooperates with individual professors as well as different European universities. Some of the courses were winners of the MOOC Production Fellowship held in early 2013. iversity.org officially launched the MOOC platform online in October 2013 and as of February 2015 has a user base of 600,000 online learners, enrolled in 63 courses offered by 41 partner universities. iversity is the only MOOC platform offering courses with ECTS-integration. iversity has branch offices in Bernau bei Berlin, Germany and Berlin.

== History ==
- Initial idea and development of a beta-version of the platform in 2008 by founder Jonas Liepmann.
- This startup is said to have begun in 2011 and offered online collaboration tools for learning management with Hannes Klöpper as the co-founder and the second managing director.
- In 2012 iversity decided to become a European-based MOOC platform
- Spring 2013 – iversity and the Stifterverband für die Deutsche Wissenschaft launched “The MOOC Production Fellowship” as a competition for online course concepts. A jury chose 10 of the best MOOC concepts out of more than 250 entries. The winners were each awarded €25,000 for the production of their courses.
- In October 2013 iversity relaunched as a platform for online courses, initially with 10 courses and 115,000 registered users.
- In January 2014 online learners were able to take the first paid final, on-site exams, through which iversity earned its first revenues.
- In October 2014, exactly one year after the relaunch, iversity's total funding reached over €5 million.
- In August 2016, iversity secured a new investment from Holtzbrinck Digital, after filing for insolvency in July 2016.

== Courses ==
Massive Open Online Courses (MOOCs) harness visual elements (lecture videos, animations, graphics), interactive elements (simulations) and written materials (scientific articles). All elements can be reviewed at any time. Instructors and course participants can interact with each other in discussion forums. Instructors can use quizzes to get feedback on the learning progress of the course participants. Most iversity courses end with a final assessment or exam. Exams can be taken on-site, online as “proctored-exam” or in form of a final project that has to be handed in to the instructor.

Students at iversity.org can choose between different study paths, resulting in different certificates. “Statement of Participation” is free-of-charge, other certificates come with varying costs – depending on which level of certification the student chooses. Universities that offer a course at iversity have the option of offering European Credit Transfer and Accumulation System (ECTS) credits. This track allows students to receive credits from their courses and apply them to their university studies. ECTS Credits can be used at any European Higher Education Institution. A certificate that awards ECTS credits is issued once the participant has passed an on-site or online proctored exam. Enrolment to courses is free, costs only apply when purchasing certificates.

For the production of courses, iversity collaborates with European universities and individual professors. Lecturers design their MOOCs with technical support from iversity. iversity cooperates with institutions such as

- Libera Università Internazionale degli Studi Sociali Guido Carli (LUISS)
- RWTH Aachen
- University of Buckingham
- United Nations Environment Programme (UNEP)
- Hertie School of Governance
- European University Institute
- University of Tübingen
- University of Mainz
- Reutlingen University (Hochschule Reutlingen in German)

== Business Model ==
iversity earns revenue through the sale of certificates, which online learners receive after completing courses on iversity.org thereby catering to all types of learners, among them working professionals who need to document their learning achievements and university students. Some courses at iversity can be integrated into the student's diploma through the European Credit Transfer and Accumulation System (ECTS). iversity has raised more than €5 million in venture capital. The investors are T-Venture, BMP media investors, BFB Frühphasenfonds, Masoud Kamali, Westtech Ventures, CRALS, Peter Zühlsdorf and Kontor B45. The iversity advisory board consists of Dr. Jörg Dräger and Prof. Édouard Husson.

== See also ==
- ALISON (company)
- EdX
- IONISx
- MIT OpenCourseWare
- National Programme on Technology Enhanced Learning, India
- OpenCourseWare
- Tufts OpenCourseWare
- TechChange
- Udacity
- Udemy
- Flooved
- Eliademy
- Khan Academy
- Coursera
- OpenLearning
- France Université Numérique
- FutureLearn
