= Ionis =

Ionis may refer to:

- IONIS Education Group
- IONIS School of Technology and Management
- Ionis Pharmaceuticals
