= Le Kremlin-Bicêtre =

- Commune
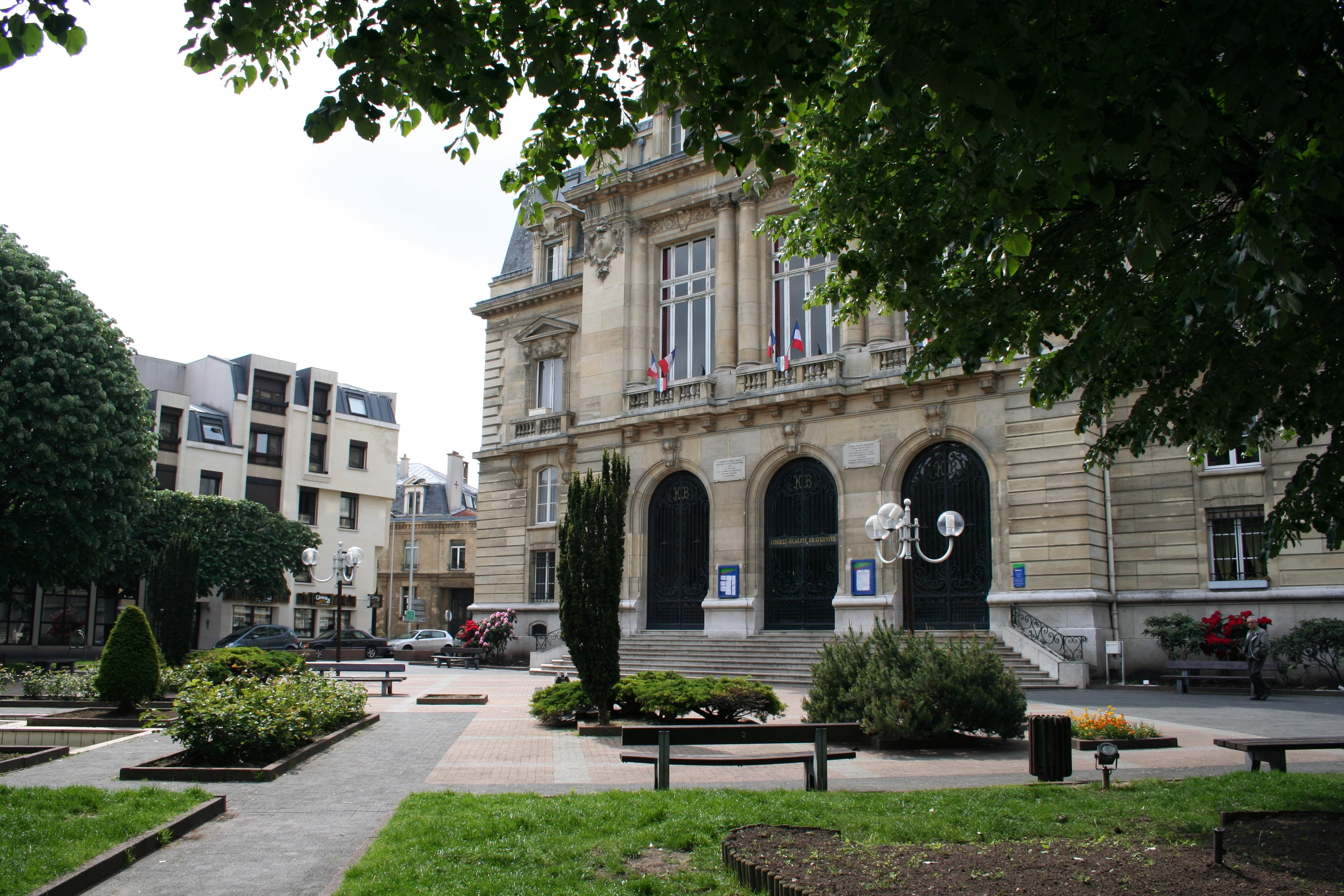
- The Hôtel de Ville

- Coat of arms

- Location (in red) within Paris inner suburbs
- Location of Le Kremlin-Bicêtre
- Location within France Location within Île-de-France (region)
- Coordinates: 48°48′36″N 2°21′29″E
- Country: France
- Region: Île-de-France
- Department: Val-de-Marne
- Arrondissement: L'Haÿ-les-Roses
- Canton: Le Kremlin-Bicêtre
- Intercommunality: Grand Paris

Government
  - Mayor (2026–32): Lionel Zinciroglu
- Area^{1}: 1.54 km^{2} (0.59 sq mi)
- Highest elevation: 115 m (377 ft)
- Lowest elevation: 45 m (148 ft)
- Population (2023): 24,110
  - Density: 15,700/km^{2} (40,500/sq mi)
- Time zone: UTC+01:00 (CET)
  - Summer (DST): UTC+02:00 (CEST)
- INSEE/Postal code: 94043 /94270
- ^{1} French Land Register data, which excludes lakes, ponds, glaciers > 1 km^{2} (0.386 sq mi or 247 acres) and river estuaries.

Le Kremlin-Bicêtre (French pronunciation: [lə kʁɛmlɛ̃ bisɛtʁ]) is a commune in the southern suburbs of Paris, France. It is 4.5 km (2.8 mi) from the center of Paris. It is one of the most densely populated municipalities in Europe.

Le Kremlin-Bicêtre is most famous as the location of the Bicêtre Hospital, where Superintendent Philippe Pinel is credited as being the first to introduce humane methods into the treatment of the mentally ill, in 1793. Its most notorious guest was the Marquis de Sade.

== Urbanism ==
Le Kremlin-Bicêtre is an urban commune, as it is one of the dense or intermediate density communes, as defined by the Insee communal density grid. (Note: According to the zoning of rural and urban municipalities published in November 2020, in application of the new definition of rurality validated on November 14, 2020 by the Interministerial Committee for Rural Areas.) It belongs to the urban unit of Paris, an inter-departmental conurbation comprising 407 communes and 10,785,092 inhabitants in 2017, of which it is a suburban commune.

The commune is also part of the functional area of Paris (Note: In October 2020, the concept of functional area replaced that of urban area in order to enable consistent comparisons with other European Union countries) where it is located in the main population and employment centre of the functional area. This area comprises 1,929 communes.

== Toponymy ==
The name has roots both in England and Russia. Le Kremlin-Bicêtre was originally a hamlet called simply Bicêtre and located within the commune of Gentilly. The name Bicêtre comes from the manor built there by John of Pontoise, Bishop of Winchester (England), in the end of the 13th century. The name of this Manor of Winchester was corrupted into Vinchestre, then Bichestre, and eventually Bicêtre. The Bicêtre Hospital was built starting in 1634 on the ruins of the manor.

In 1813, the Bicêtre Hospital acted as a major reception point for evacuated casualties of the Grande Armée from the French invasion of Russia. Veterans of the invasion of Russia used to gather in a tavern near Bicêtre Hospital. This tavern was soon renamed Au sergent du Kremlin ("At the Kremlin sergeant") in reference to the Moscow Kremlin where the veterans had camped.

Gradually the name Kremlin was used for the whole neighborhood around the Bicêtre Hospital, and appeared for the first time officially in an ordnance map of 1832. Later the names Kremlin and Bicêtre were joined together and became the official name of the area.

== History ==
The commune of Le Kremlin-Bicêtre was created on 13 December 1896 by detaching its territory from the commune of Gentilly. The Hôtel de Ville was completed in 1903.

== Population ==
Historical population

Year	Pop.	±% p.a.
1896	10,804	—
1901	11,830	+1.83%
1906	13,018	+1.93%
1911	14,907	+2.75%
1921	16,830	+1.22%
1926	18,911	+2.36%
1931	17,453	−1.59%
1936	17,038	−0.48%
1946	14,072	−1.89%
1954	15,618	+1.31%

Year	Pop.	±% p.a.
1962	18,834	+2.37%
1968	20,798	+1.67%
1975	20,061	−0.51%
1982	17,543	−1.90%
1990	19,348	+1.23%
1999	23,724	+2.29%
2007	25,859	+1.08%
2012	26,119	+0.20%
2017	25,334	−0.61%
2023	24,110	−0.82%

Source: EHESS and INSEE (1968-2023)

== Transport ==
Le Kremlin-Bicêtre is served by Le Kremlin-Bicêtre station on Paris Métro Line 7, and Hôpital Bicêtre station on Paris Métro Line 14.

== Education ==
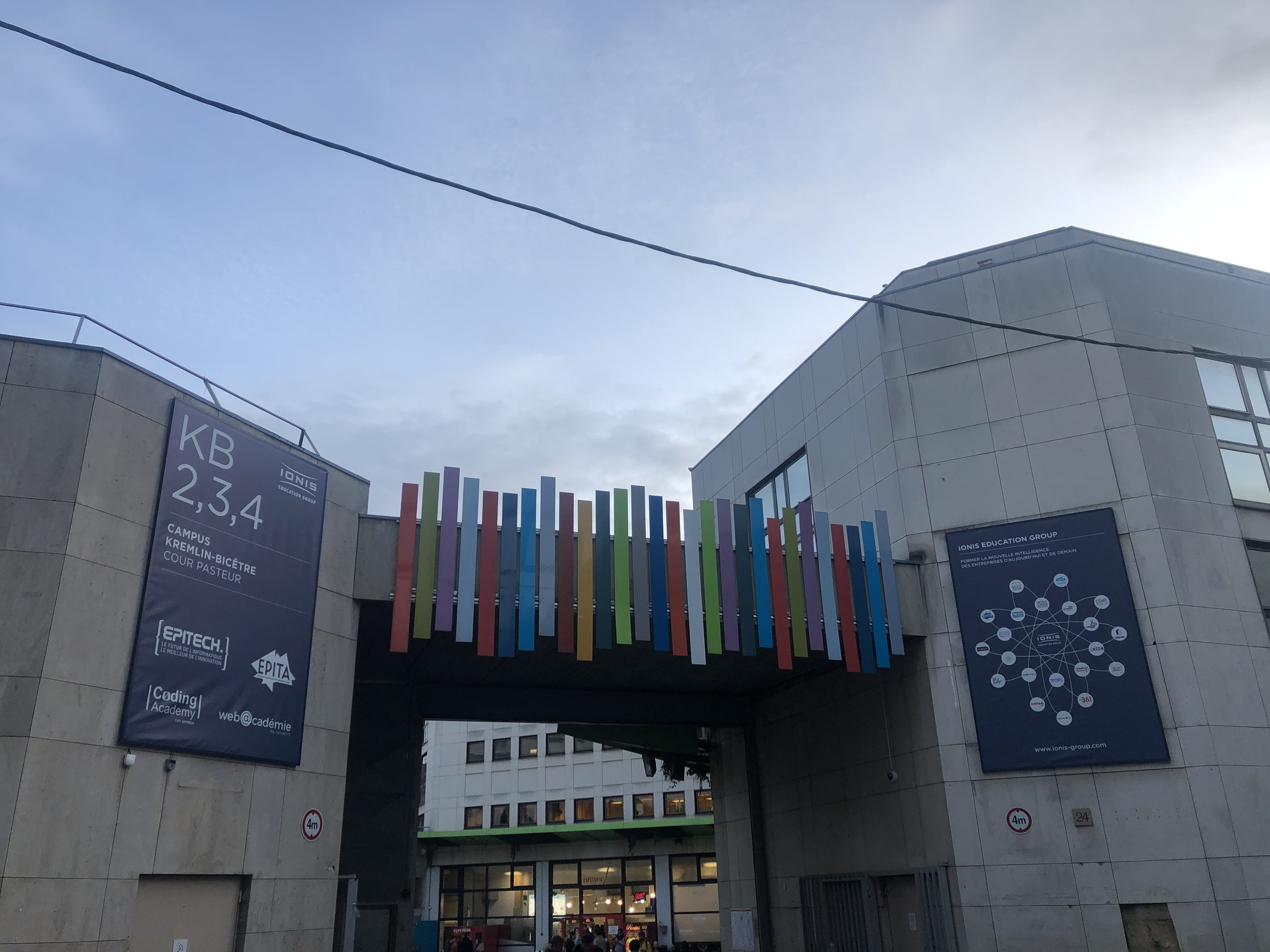
Epitech Paris.

Public primary and secondary schools:

- Five preschools: Benoît-Malon, Jean-Zay, Pauline-Kergomard, Robert-Desnos, Suzanne-Buisson
- Five elementary schools: Benoît-Malon A, Benoît-Malon B, Charles-Péguy, Pierre-Brossolette

Secondary schools:

- Public junior high schools: Collège Jean-Perrin and Collège Albert-Cron
- Public senior high schools: Lycée intercommunal Darius-Milhaud and Lycée Pierre-Brossolette

There is one private elementary and junior high, Jeanne-d'Arc.

Le Kremlin-Bicêtre also has the computer science schools EPITA and EPITECH. The computer programming school Coding Academy, IONIS School of Technology and Management, the Web@cademie and the school E-Artsup are also located in the commune.

== Notable residents ==
- Roger Caillois (1913–1978), writer, sociologist, and literary critic.
- Suzanne Flon (1918–2005), actress and comedian, born at Kremlin-Bicêtre.
- Kamelancien (aka Kamelanc'), rap artist of Moroccan origin, who debuted in 1993.
- Charles Lavialle (Émile Charles Jean Aldéric Lavialle) was an actor, who died 16 October 1965 in this town.
- Lazare Ponticelli, the last surviving French and Italian veteran of World War I, Resistance member and industrialist, died here in 2008.
- Vincent Purkart, seven-time French table tennis champion and creator of the Secrétin-Purkart Show, a humorous look at the sport broadcast on television.
- Jean-François Revel, intellectual, lived in this town during the latter part of his life, and he died here in April 2006.

== Gallery ==
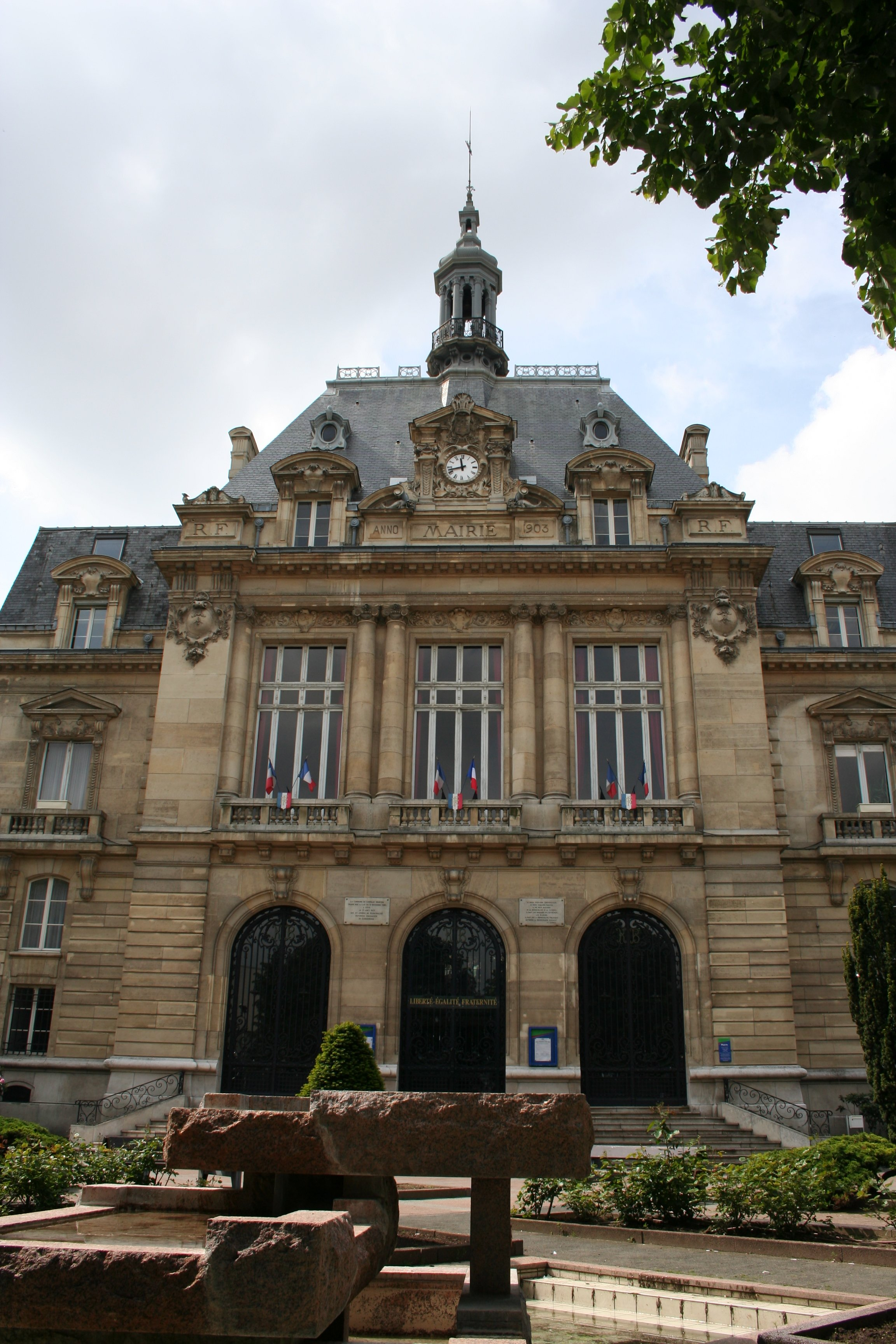
Townhall

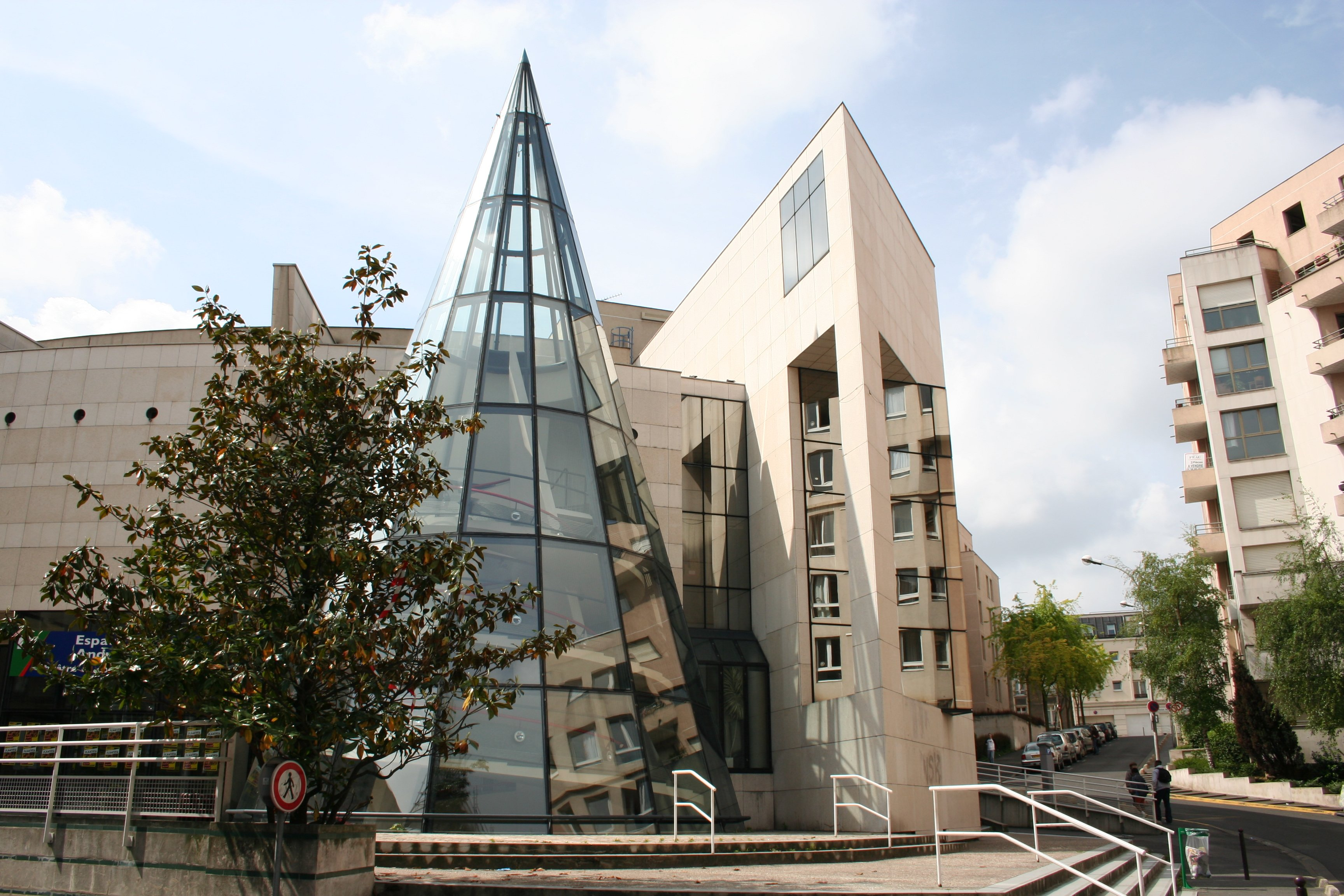
Music School & cultural center "André Malraux"

== See also ==
- Communes of the Val-de-Marne department
- Fort de Bicêtre
