= Léna Situations =

French vlogger (born 1997)

Léna Situations (Léna Mahfouf)
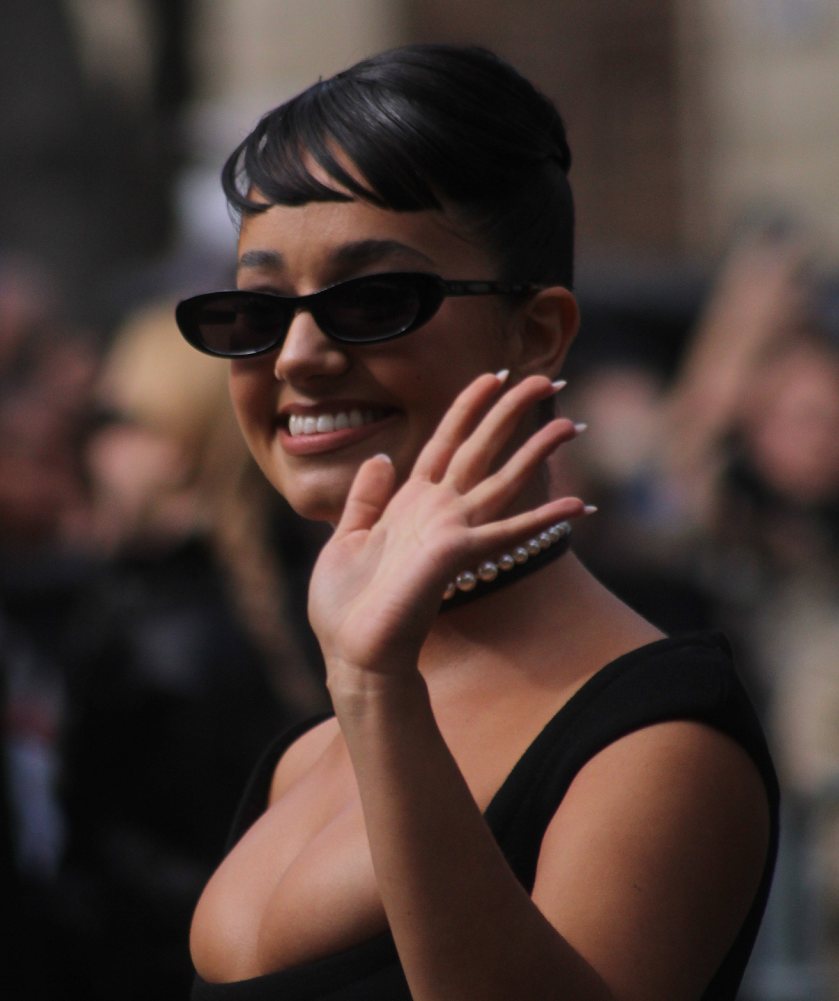
- Léna Situations in 2023
- Born: Léna Mahfouf; 19 November 1997 (age 28); 17th arrondissement of Paris, France
- Occupations: Social media personality; author
- Years active: 2016–present

YouTube information
- Subscribers: 2.89 million
- Views: 569 million
- Last updated: 4 December 2024

Léna Mahfouf (French pronunciation: [lena mafuf]; born 19 November 1997), also known as Léna Situations, is a French social media personality, author, and YouTuber of Algerian descent.

In 2021, Forbes France included her in their annual 30 Under 30 list for Cinema & Entertainment. On May 2, 2022, she became the first French influencer invited to the Met Gala, and later that year, she attended the Cannes Film Festival.

== Early life and education ==
Léna Mahfouf was born in the 17th arrondissement of Paris, to Algerian parents. Her father Karim Mahfouf, is a comics author, illustrator, and puppeteer. Her mother is a former fashion designer. Her parents moved to Paris to escape the Algerian Civil War.

She graduated from the Moda Domani Institute business school.

== Career ==
Mahfouf began her career in 2012 by launching a blog, Léna Situations where she shared advice on fashion, beauty, and Parisian lifestyle recommendations. In 2017, she expanded her content by creating a YouTube channel. As of November 2023, she has more than 2.69 million YouTube subscribers, 3.2 million Instagram followers and 4.5 million TikTok followers. Her content primarily focuses on vlogs, fashion, and lifestyle, and she frequently collaborates with other influencers such as Sundy, Bilal Hassani, Jules, and Sulivan Gwen.

In August 2022, Mahfouf announced the creation of an association called „Always Plus“, aimed at providing guidance to students on financing their studies. In September 2022, she began hosting a podcast on Spotify titled „Canapé Six Places.“

In collaboration with Adidas, Mahfouf released a collection of four sneakers on November 3, 2022, co-created with 150 subscribers. She was the first French woman to partner with the brand.

On September 24, 2020, Mahfouf published her personal development book, „"Always More“. The book sold over 60,000 copies within its first month, making it a bestseller in France by October 2020. By August 2021, it had sold over 370,000 copies. She has also appeared as a guest judge on Drag Race France during the "Time Ball" episode on August 4, 2023.

== Hôtel Mahfouf ==
On June 27, 2022, Mahfouf launched Hôtel Mahfouf, a clothing and lifestyle brand.

== Personal life ==
Starting in February 2020, she was in a relationship with Sébastien Frit, also known as Seb La Frite. Their breakup was announced in 2026.
