= Adrienne Jablanczy =

French economist

- Born: Adrienne Jablanczy; 11 September 1948 (age 77)
- Citizenship: French
- Education: Bachelor's degree in Mathematics; Master's degree
- Alma mater: University of Paris 1 Pantheon-Sorbonne; Institut d'Études Politiques de Paris
- Occupation: Executive Director of the Institut supérieur européen de gestion
- Years active: Since 1976
- Employer: IONIS Education Group
- Known for: Executive Director of the Institut supérieur européen de gestion

Adrienne Jablanczy (born 11 September 1948) is a French economist, professor and, since 1997, executive director of the Institut supérieur européen de gestion group.

== Biography ==
Jablanczy graduated from the Pantheon-Sorbonne University and the Institut d'Études Politiques de Paris. Jablanczy started her career in 1976 as a monetary economics and monetary theory teacher at Panthéon-Assas University. At the time, she was responsible for economics training at the European Business School Paris (EBS). In 1980, she became the head of training at EBS. In 1997, she was nominated Director of the ISEG. She is also a financial markets teacher at the École Nationale Supérieure des Télécommunications de Bretagne.

Jablanzcy specializes in management of business schools, financial markets, Islamic finance and sovereign wealth funds. She is the author of La Bourse (The Stock Exchange) and, with Philippe Beraud, Crise et Variables d’Ajustement des États Méditerranéens, in May 2010.

== Bibliography ==
- Adrienne Jablanczy, La Bourse, Marabout, 1991, ISBN 2501015665
- Adrienne Jablanczy and Philippe Beraud, Crise et variables d’ajustement des États méditerranéens, Management & Avenir, ISSN 1768-5958, May 2010
