= Beijing Institute of Petrochemical Technology =

Municipal public college in Daxing, Beijing, China

Coordinates: 39.74596°N 116.31959°E

- Other names: Shihua Xueyuan
- Motto: 宁静致远，务本维新
- Type: Municipal
- Established: 1978; 48 years ago
- Endowment: CNY500 million
- President: Guo Wenli
- Academic staff: 830
- Students: 8,000
- Undergraduates: 6,800
- Postgraduates: 100
- Location: Beijing, China
- Campus: 483 Mu
- Colors: Blue and white
- Website: www.bipt.edu.cn

Chinese name
- Simplified Chinese: 北京石油化工学院
- Traditional Chinese: 北京石油化工學院
Transcriptions
Standard Mandarin
- Hanyu Pinyin: Běijīng Shíyóu Huàgōng Xuéyuàn

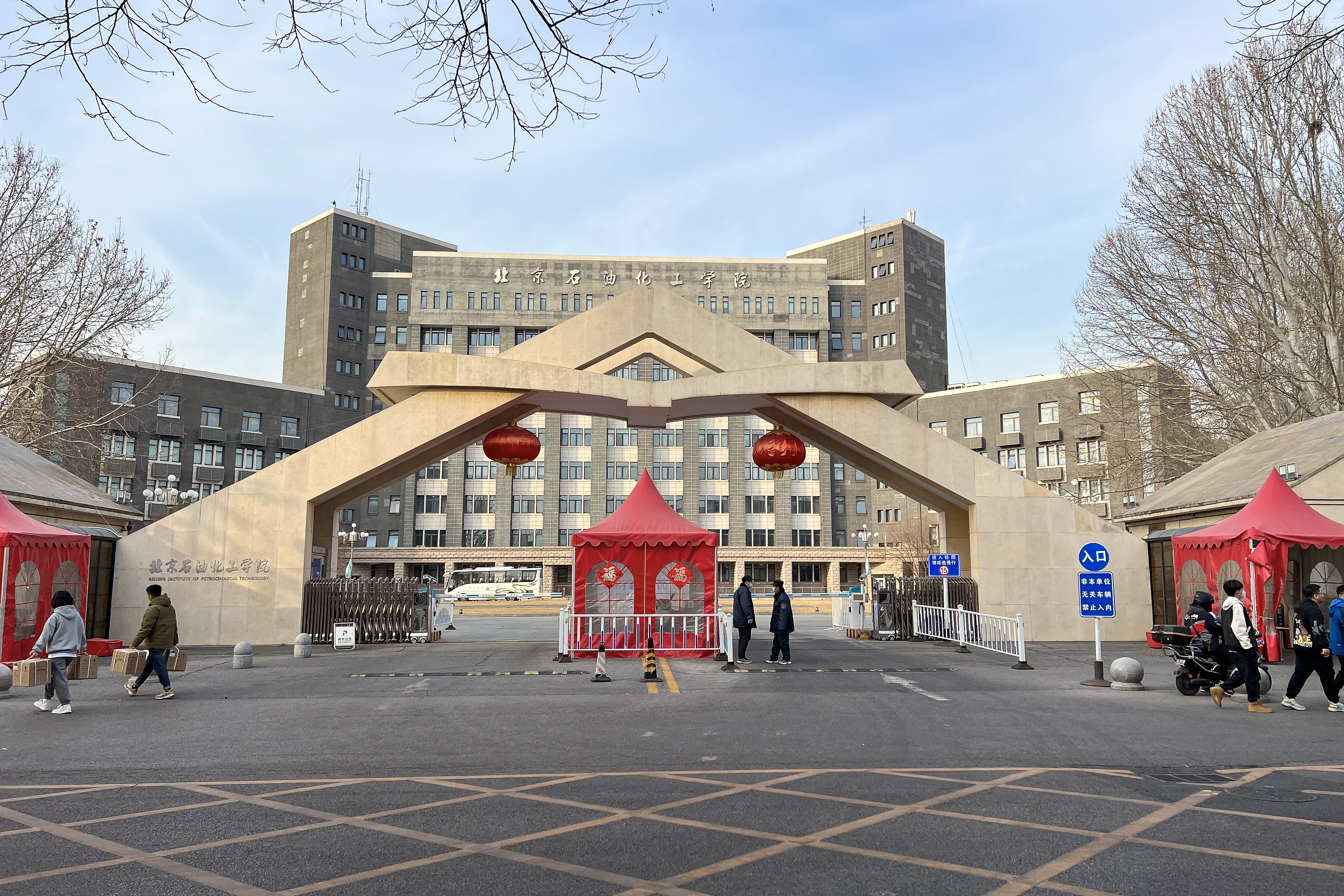
Main campus

The Beijing Institute of Petrochemical Technology (BIPT; 北京石油化工学院) is a municipal public college in Daxing, Beijing, China. It is affiliated with the City of Beijing and funded by the Beijing Municipal People's Government.

The predecessor of the college is Beijing Petrochemical College founded in 1978 and the Second Branch of the Beijing Chemical Engineering College. In 1985, the school was placed under the management of China Petrochemical Corporation. In 1992, the school established the Beijing Petrochemical and Chemical Engineering College on the basis of Beijing Petrochemical and Chemical Engineering Senior Vocational College. In 2000, the school was placed under the funding and management of the Beijing Municipal People's Government.

BIPT 30 Anniversary

== Colleges and departments ==
- Chemical Engineering College
- Mechanical Engineering College
- Information Engineering College
- School of Economics and Management
- School of Humanities and Social Sciences
- Material Science and Engineering Department
- Mathematics and Physics Department
- Foreign Languages Department
- Department of Physical Education
- Engineering Education Center
- International Education College
- Continuing Education College

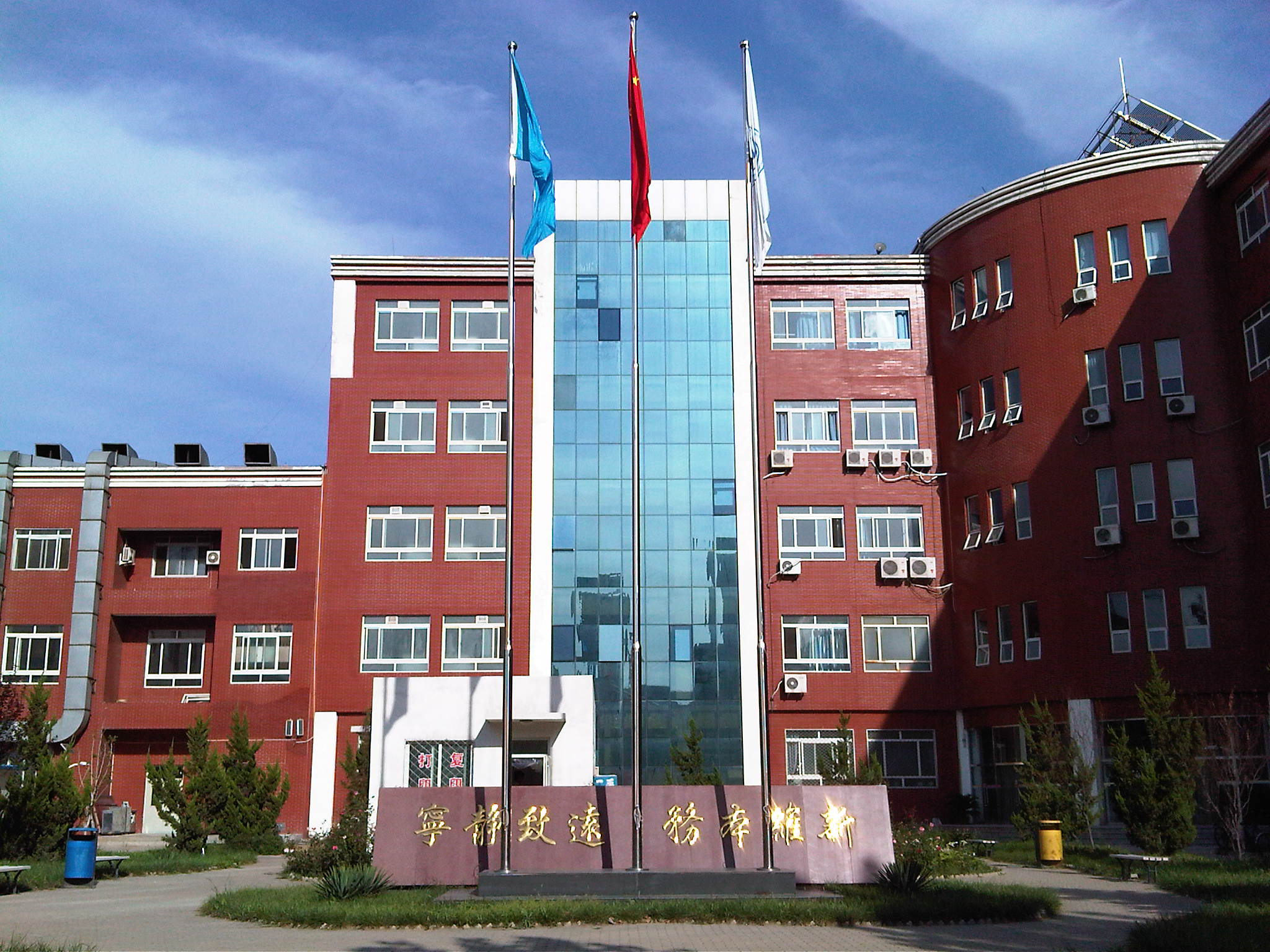
Kangzhuang Campus

== Activities ==
The Beijing Institute of Petrochemical Technology own a practice base in Yanshan Petrochemical Group, which is located in Fangshan District. Students from chemical industry majors of BIPT come to the base every year for field work based in the factory. Students of other majors also have a chance to visit the factory for one time during their college life. This is to deepen their understanding of theoretical knowledge and strengthen their competence.

== International cooperation ==
The BIPT has established a long-term stable cooperative relationship with some overseas universities; these universities sent students to each other to enhance academic exchanges every year. Some of the cooperated universities:

- UK University of the West of Scotland
- France ESME Sudria
- France ESIEE-AMIENS
- Germany University of Duisburg-Essen
- Norway Narvik University College
- US Columbus State University
- US St. Cloud State University

In 2014, the BIPT will open a new Mastère en sciences course in partnership with ESME Sudria.

== Future development ==
Two separated campuses in Tsingyuan and Kangzhuang have long time been a bottleneck in the university's evolution, the opening of Line 4, Beijing Subway and the construction of Beijing–Shanghai High-Speed Railway has galloped local real estate price and which made a further expansion harder than ever. A decision in spring 2011 will compel the Economic and Management College garrison in Kangzhuang campus along while other ten colleges move to Tsingyuan campus, but students and professors of E&M College have been complaining the poor conditions and dispossessed surroundings of Kangzhuang campus.
