= FutureLearn =

British digital education platform

- Website type: Online education
- Available in: English, French, Dutch, Spanish, Chinese
- Owner: Global University Systems
- Key people: Ian Howell (June 2023) (Managing Director); Jo Johnson (Chair of the Board)
- Website: www.futurelearn.com
- Commercial: Yes
- Registration: Required
- Users: 17 million (September 2021)
- Launched: December 2012; 13 years ago
- Current status: Active

FutureLearn is a British digital education platform founded in December 2012. The company was acquired by Global University Systems in December 2022 and previously jointly owned by The Open University and SEEK Ltd. It is a massive open online course (MOOC), microcredential and degree learning platform.

As of November 2023, it included over 260 UK and international partners, including industry and government partners and 20 million total registered learners.

== History ==
FutureLearn was launched with 12 university partners, seeking those who "consistently rank at the top end of the…league tables". The 12 founding partners are: The Open University, University of Birmingham, University of Bristol, Cardiff University, University of East Anglia, University of Exeter, King's College London, Lancaster University, University of Leeds, University of Southampton, St Andrews University, and University of Warwick.

The launch was described as a move to 'fight back' and provide a space for UK institutions to engage in the MOOC space.

In 2016, FutureLearn became the first platform for students to earn credits towards a degree from a top UK university from their tablets and smartphones.

In April 2019, FutureLearn announced that SEEK would invest £50 million in the company. In return, SEEK would receive a 50% stake in the company.

In December 2022, Global University Systems, which owns and operates several private for-profit colleges and universities, acquired FutureLearn, and Jo Johnson became chair of the board of the company.

== Courses ==
FutureLearn's courses span a broad range of topics. The first course opened on 14 October 2013. The first courses to be made available included "Web science: how the web is changing the world" (University of Southampton), "Introduction to ecosystems" (The Open University), "Improving your image: dental photography in practice" (University of Birmingham), "Causes of war" (King's College London), "The discovery of the Higgs boson" (University of Edinburgh), "Discover dentistry" (University of Sheffield), "Muslims in Britain: changes and challenges" (Cardiff University), "Begin programming: build your first mobile game" (University of Reading) and "England in the time of King Richard III" (University of Leicester). The first course to launch was "The secret power of brands", conducted by professor Robert Jones of the University of East Anglia.

As of January 2024, FutureLearn now has an expansive course portfolio stemming across the full spectrum, with a focus on business, teaching, healthcare and IT courses, including "Innovative Leadership: Developing Curiosity", conducted by Dr. Diane Hamilton.

== See also ==
- Pluralsight
- EdX
- Coursera
- Udemy
- Udacity
- LinkedIn Learning
- Khan Academy
- iversity
- France Université Numérique
