= Web@cademie =

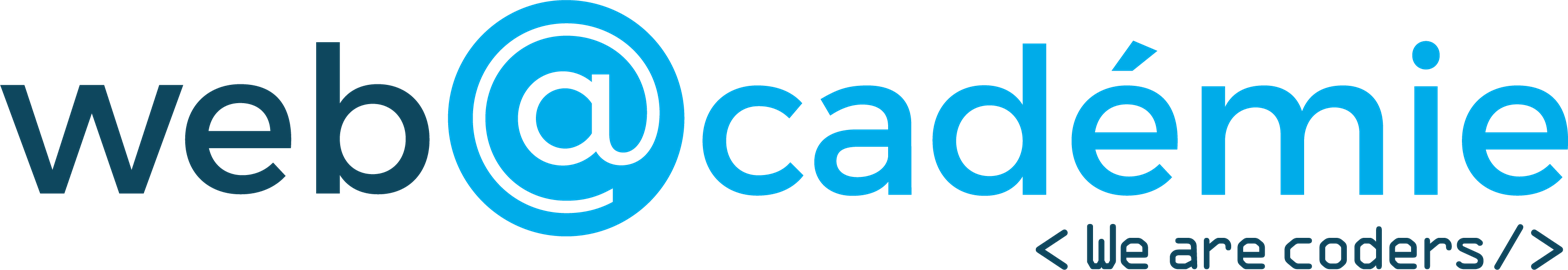
- Motto: We are coders
- Type: private nonprofit tuition-free institution
- Established: 2010
- Parent institution: IONIS Education Group, Epitech, Zup de Co
- Location: Le Kremlin-Bicêtre, Lyon, Nancy, Strasbourg, France; 48°48′55″N 2°21′47″E
- Website: webacademie.org

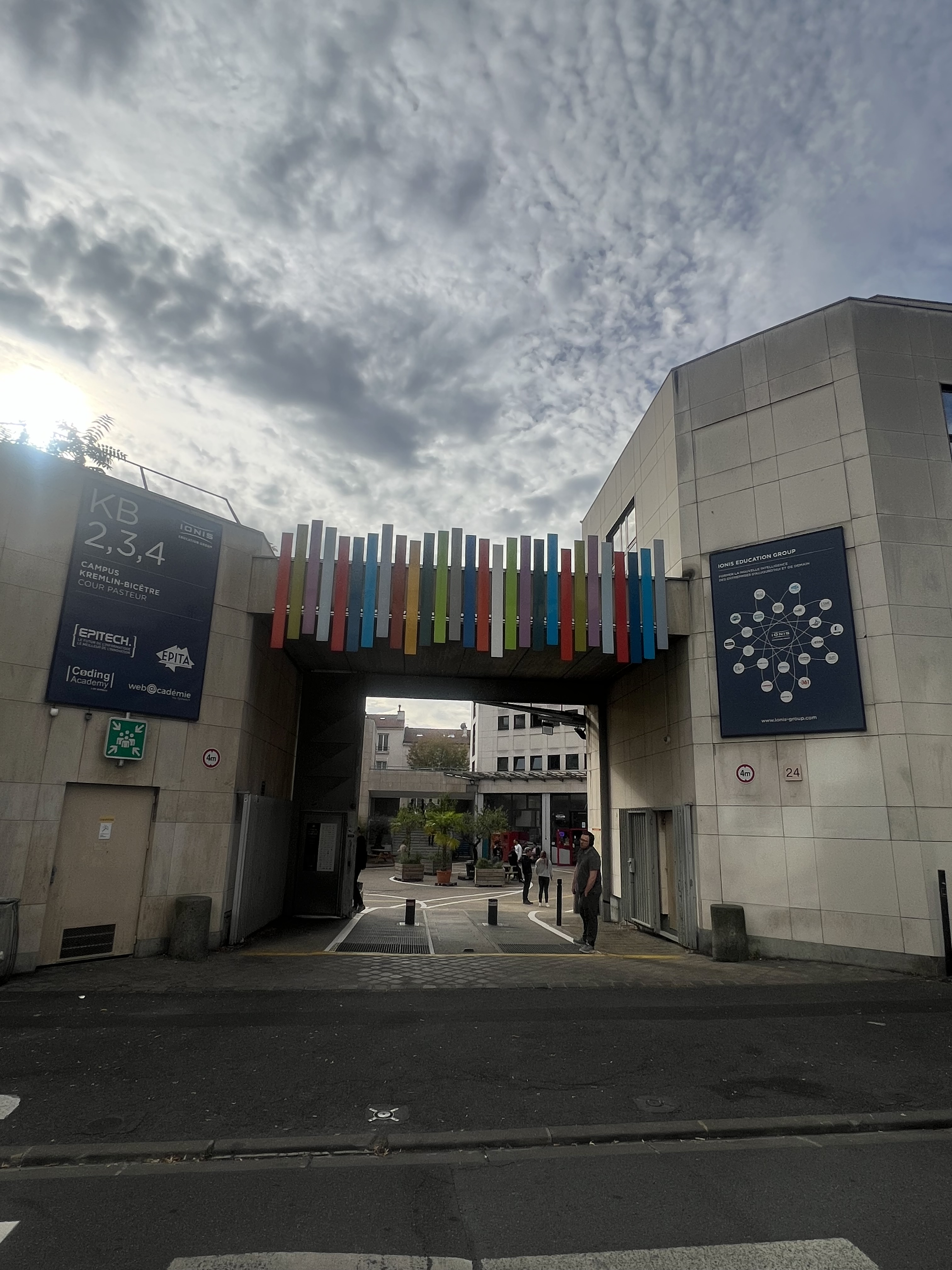
Web@cademie Paris campus at Le Kremlin Bicêtre

Web@cademie is a private, nonprofit and tuition-free computer programming school created and funded by French IONIS Education Group with several partners including Epitech and Zup de Co association. The school was first opened in Paris in 2010.

Headquartered in Le Kremlin-Bicêtre, the school has branches in Lyon, Strasbourg and Nancy.

Web@cademie delivers a two-year program dedicated to people with no degree and no background (without the French Baccalaureate but with a strong motivation in computer science). This is to help dropout students to have a job in a competitive industry.

The school has received the award Grande École du Numérique. The school is a non-profit organization and is entirely free. Major companies such as Microsoft give financial support.
