= IONIS Education Group =

Private, for-profit, higher education group in France

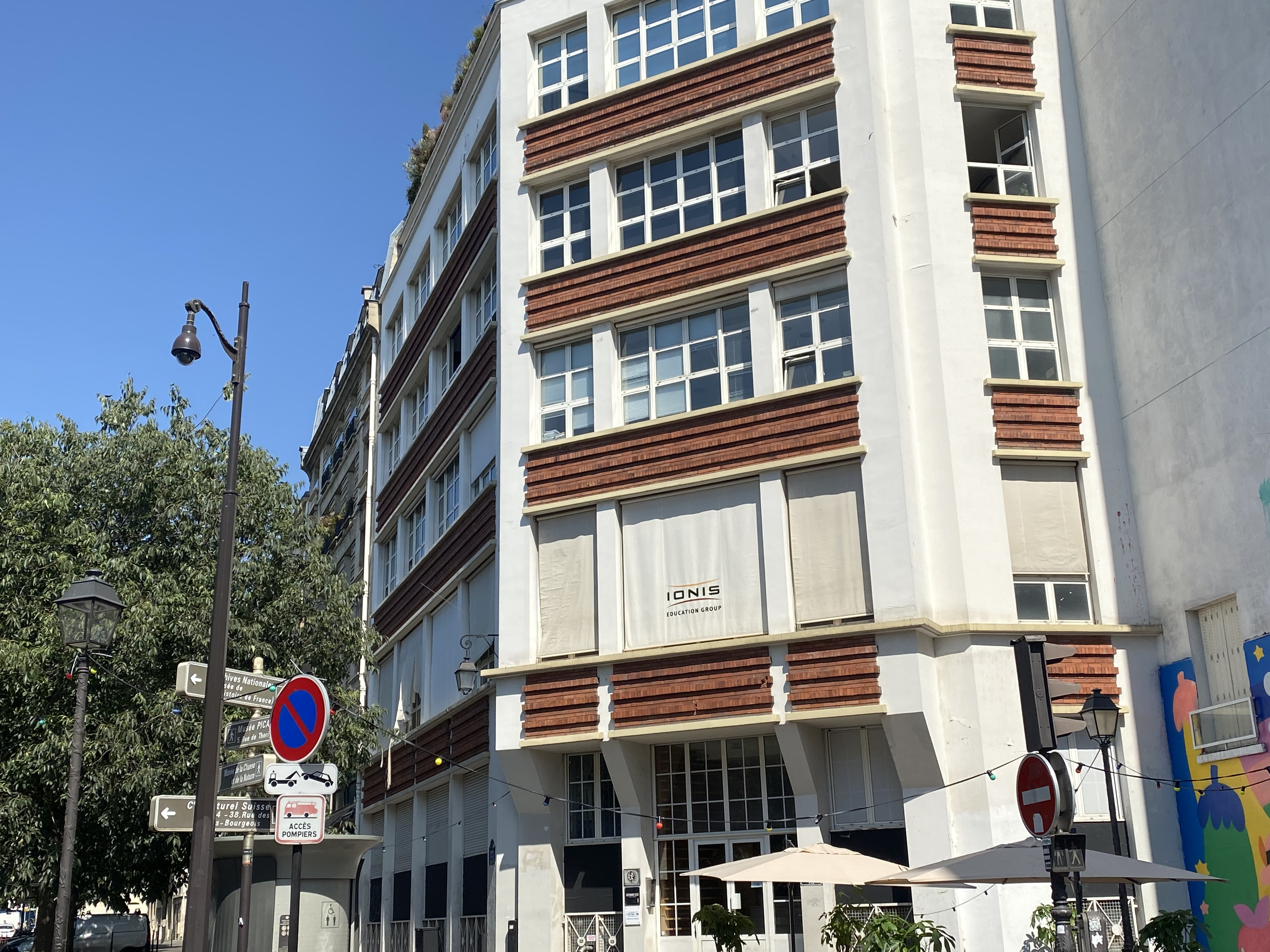
- Headquarters in Paris
- Motto: Former la nouvelle intelligence des entreprises
- Motto in English: Train a new intelligence for business
- Type: For-profit
- Established: 1980
- Chancellor: Marc Sellam
- Vice-Chancellor: Fabrice Bardeche, Charline Avenel, Philippe Jamet
- Students: 35,000
- Location: Paris, France
- Campus: Urban
- Website: www.ionis-group.com

IONIS Education Group is a private, for-profit, higher education group in France. It was created in 1980 and by 2023 had more than 35,000 students and 100,000 alumni. There are 29 further education colleges in the group.

== History ==
Marc Sellam created the Institut supérieur européen de gestion group in Paris in 1980 as a business school with an organization and curriculum that differed from other grandes écoles. During the 1980s regional colleges were created in Bordeaux, Toulouse, Lille, Strasbourg, Nantes and Lyon. In 1993 the Institut supérieur européen de formation par l'action business school (providing further education for three years after the Baccalauréat) was founded.

In 1997, the group, originally named Intelsup, bought a computer science college (the École pour l'informatique et les techniques avancées). In 1997 and 1998, the group bought the business school Institut supérieur de gestion and the aeronautical and space engineering college Institut polytechnique des sciences avancées.

In 1999, the group created the École pour l'informatique et les nouvelles technologies of practical computer science and in 2001 E-Artsup, a college for digital design and multimedia. The name IONIS Education Group was adopted in 2002, at which point all of its colleges offered five-year courses. In 2003 it entered the biotechnology sector with the Institut Sup'Biotech de Paris. ICS Begue, a 1957 accountancy college, was acquired in 2004 and the 1905 engineering college École spéciale de mécanique et électricité in 2006. During 2007 and 2008 regional colleges were opened in Bordeaux, Lille, Lyon, Marseille, Nancy, Nantes, Nice, Montpellier, Strasbourg and Toulouse. In 2009, the group launched IONIS Executive Learning and the IONIS School of Technology and Management In 2010, ISEG became three independent schools in finance, marketing - communication and business. In 2011 the Sup'Internet, an Internet college opened.

In February 2013, the management of the group announced the projects for the next ten years. They are focused on four main areas: international development, social services, transversality and diversification. In September 2013 EPITECH will open a new campus in Beijing. In September 2014, the same university will open new campuses in California, United Kingdom and Spain. Also in 2014, ESME Sudria will also open a campus in Beijing and a new Mastère en sciences course in partnership with the Beijing Institute of Petrochemical Technology. EPITA and Sup'Internet will also open news campuses abroad in 2014.

Since September 2013, the École des technologies numériques appliquées will start a new program in 2 years after French Baccalauréat which will be entirely free. 250 tickets are available. The innovation is that there are graduate students who will pay for the students in training (250 euros per month during three years).

For people without the Baccalauréat, a new campus of the Web@cademie will open in Lyon in September 2013. The year 2013 will see the new financial endowment of the group. It plans to launch new school in the areas of luxury, design and fashion. It also wants to develop day release or night school education for employees provided by companies by developing programs based on the 14 Master of Business Administration degrees of IONIS School of Technology and Management and the 11th of the ISG Business School.

In February 2014, a new business school specialized in luxury, fashion and design called Moda Domani Institute is opened.

In September 2014, a new digital and innovative campus will open in Paris (Le Marais-Bastille) bringing together the Institut supérieur européen de gestion group, Sup'Internet and E-Artsup.

In 2020, the group bought the computer science institution Supinfo.

In 2021, the group opened the artificial intelligence College IA Institut and the ISG Sport Business Management School dedicated to sport business.

In 2023, IONIS group created ISG RH, a school dedicated to human resources and legal professions.

In 2023, EPITA and Chang’An University announced the launch of a new joint Bachelor’s program in Artificial Intelligence. The four-year, full-time program, accredited by the Chinese Ministry of Education, will confer graduates a Bachelor’s degree in Artificial Intelligence. The inaugural cohort started attending classes in September 2023. Students would attend courses at the Chang’An University campus in Xi’an, with some courses taught by professors-in-residence from EPITA.

== Member schools ==
=== Business ===
- Institut supérieur de gestion (ISG)
- Institut supérieur européen de gestion group
- ISG Luxury Management
- ISG Sport Business Management, in partnership with the National Basketball Association (NBA)
- ISTH
- ICS Bégué
- ISEFAC
- Institut supérieur européen de formation par l'action
- MOD'SPE Paris
- XP School

=== Technology ===
- Concours Advance
- École pour l'informatique et les techniques avancées (EPITA) (IT engineering College)
- École spéciale de mécanique et électricité (energy engineering College)
- IA Institut (Artificial intelligence College)
- Institut Polytechnique des Sciences Avancées (IPSA) (aeronautical and aerospace engineering College)
- Institut Sup'Biotech de Paris (biotechnology engineering College)
- E-Artsup
- Epitech Digital
- Epitech Executive
- École pour l'informatique et les nouvelles technologies (EPITECH)
- IONIS School of Technology and Management
- SecureSphere by EPITA
- Supinfo
- Web@cademie

=== Education ===
- École des technologies numériques appliquées
- Fondation IONIS
- IONIS 361
- IONISx
- PHG Academy

== Foundation ==
The Fondation IONIS ("IONIS Foundation") is an independent administrative agency which was established by IONIS Education Group.
