= Epitech =

French institution of higher education

Paris Graduate School of Digital Innovation
- École pour l'informatique et les nouvelles technologies (EPITECH)
- Other names: Epitech Technology
- Motto: The school of expertise in computer science
- Type: Private institution of higher education in general computer science
- Established: 1999
- Parent institution: IONIS Education Group
- President: Marc Sellam
- Director: Gildas Vinson
- Students: 6,000
- Location: Le Kremlin-Bicêtre, Bordeaux, Lille, Marseille, Lyon, Montpellier, Moulins, Mulhouse, Nancy, Nantes, Nice, Rennes, Strasbourg, Toulouse, Saint-André, Réunion. Barcelona, Madrid, Berlin, Brussels, Cotonou, France, Spain, Germany, Belgium, Benin; 48°48′55″N 2°21′47″E
- Campus: multiple sites, 20 campuses in 5 countries (2024)
- Language: English, French
- Website: epitech.eu

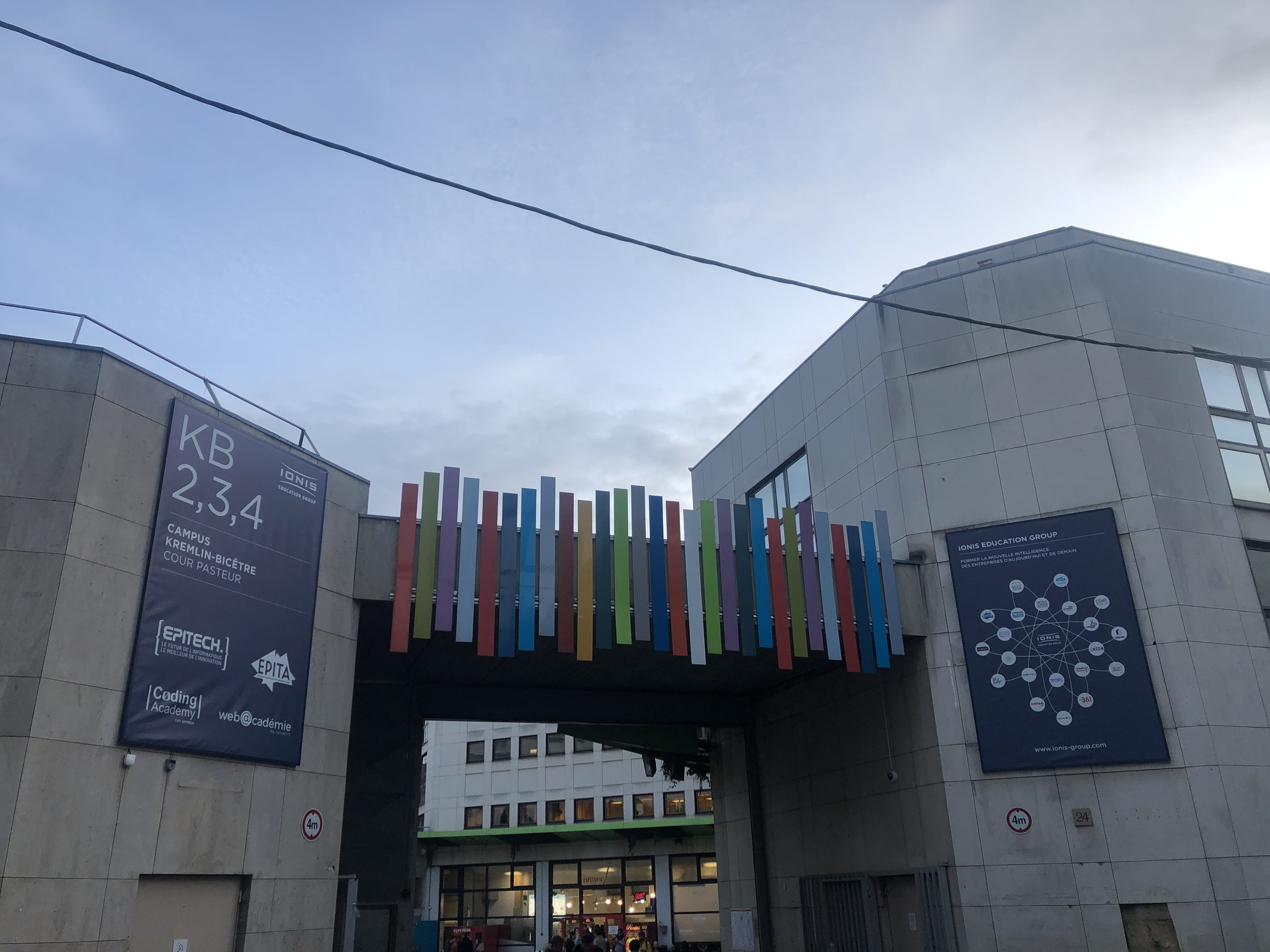
EPITECH Paris.

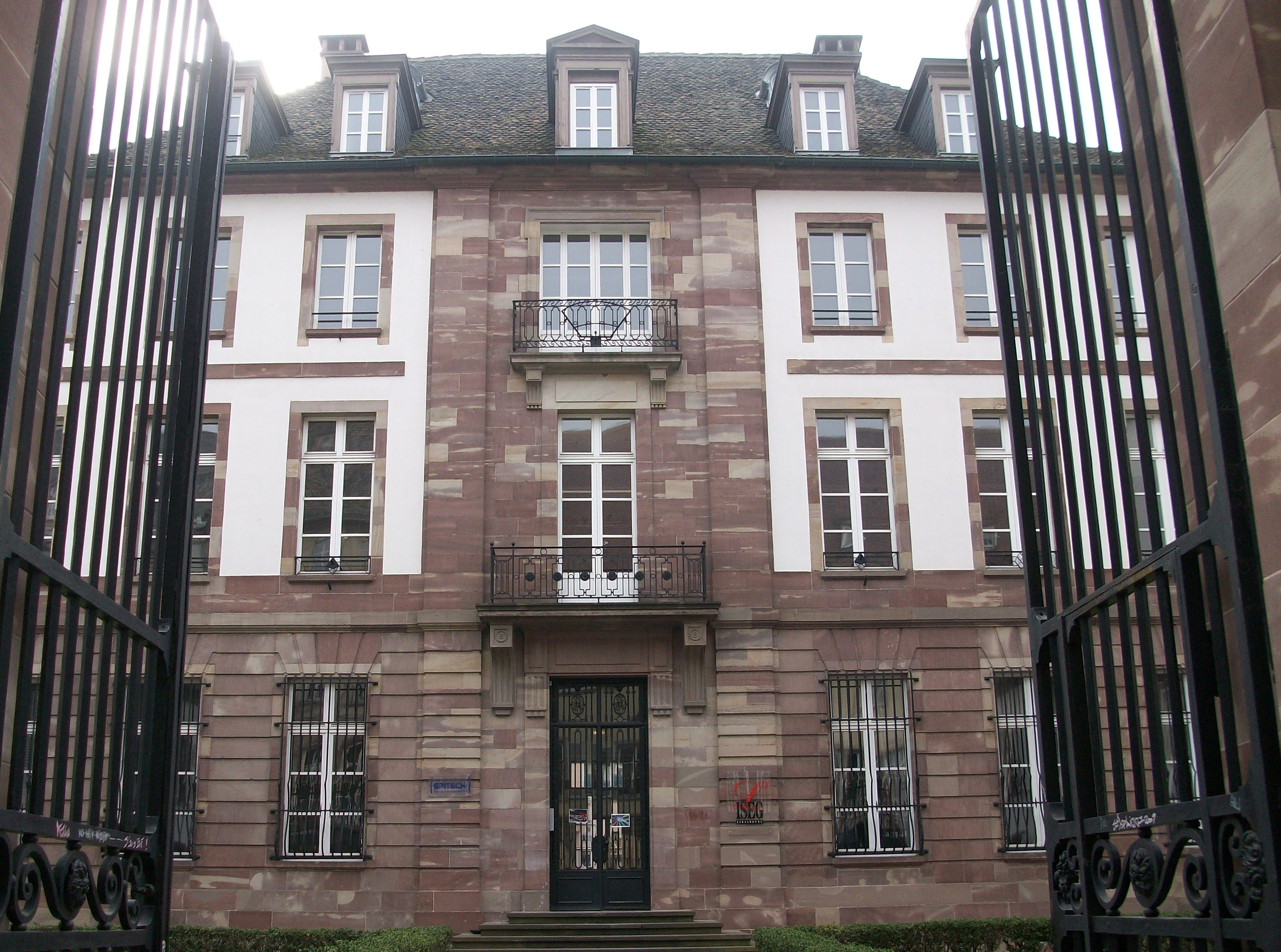
EPITECH Strasbourg.

The Paris Graduate School of Digital Innovation (French: École pour l'informatique et les nouvelles technologies, or EPITECH), formerly European Institute of Information Technology, is a private institution of higher education in computer science and software engineering that was founded in 1999.

Headquartered in Le Kremlin-Bicêtre, south of Paris, the school has campuses in Bordeaux, Rennes, Marseille, Lille, Lyon, Montpellier, Nancy, Nantes, Nice, Strasbourg, Toulouse and Saint-André, Réunion. The school also has locations in Barcelona (Spain), Tirana (Albania), Berlin (Germany), and Brussels (Belgium).

The school has the particularity to teach with practical cases instead of theoretical.

Epitech also have an executive tier, Epitech Executive, with an Executive MBA in IT and entrepreneurship course targeting executive managers in computer science, and shares its network since 2020 with Epitech Digital School, a 50%-tech 50%-business school.

The institution is part of IONIS Education Group.

== History ==
Epitech was created in 1999, taking advantage of the keen interest of the École Pour l'Informatique et les Techniques Avancées EPITA to train students with a specific interest for computer sciences related matter only.

In 2007, Epitech opened new campuses in Casablanca, Dalian, Bordeaux, Lille, Lyon, Nantes, Strasbourg and Toulouse. Since January 2008, the degree delivered has been recognized by the Commission nationale de la certification professionnelle, as level 1. In 2008, the campuses of Nice, Montpellier, Nancy, Marseille and Rennes were opened.

Since 11 January 2024, the awarded degree of the Grande Ecole program is accredited by the French Ministry of Higher Education.

=== New campuses abroad ===
In early 2013, Epitech announced it would open a campus in Beijing, China in September 2013 and further international branches in California, United Kingdom and Spain by September 2014.

In 2021, the school had opened up campuses in New York City, Berlin, Barcelona, Brussels and Geneva and made them part of a 5-year international program, where students would move out of their country to study in the various campuses in Europe and in the world.

== Partnership ==
Epitech has partnered with the Zup de Co association to create the Web@cademie, a 2-year training completely free for students without the French Baccalaureate and with a strong motivation in computer science. This course has the goal to attain a job of software developer for young people who have stopped their regular studies. They are trained by Epitech teachers at Le Kremlin-Bicêtre and in Lyon.

In 2022, Epitech and ESME-Sudria held a summer school session in robotics, aimed at international students interested at studying in Paris.

The school partners with more than 100 academic institutions worldwide, partnering with universities such as The Hague University of Applied Sciences, Jönköping University and the University of Kent. Epitech also holds a joint graduate study program in Artificial Intelligence and Internet of Things with the Algebra University College.

== Notable alumni ==
- Solomon Hykes (2006), CEO of Docker, Inc.
