= Supinfo =

Private institution of higher education in general Computer Science

Coordinates: 48°51′27.749″N 2°21′38.529″E

SUPINFO International University
- Other names: SUPINFO
- Former names: École supérieure d'Informatique
- Motto: Sign of Success
- Type: Private
- Established: 1965
- Chancellor: Marc Sellam
- Postgraduates: 7,000
- Location: 5 campus + online training, France
- Website: www.supinfo.com

SUPINFO International University, formerly called "École supérieure d'Informatique", is a private institution of higher education in Computer Science that was created in 1965 and has been recognized by the French state since 10 January 1972.

Over a five-year period SUPINFO trains ICT professionals who can work in IT organizations upon completion of their courses. They are then issued a diploma which is registered by the French State as a level I national professional certificate (Bac+5, RNCP level 7).

== History ==
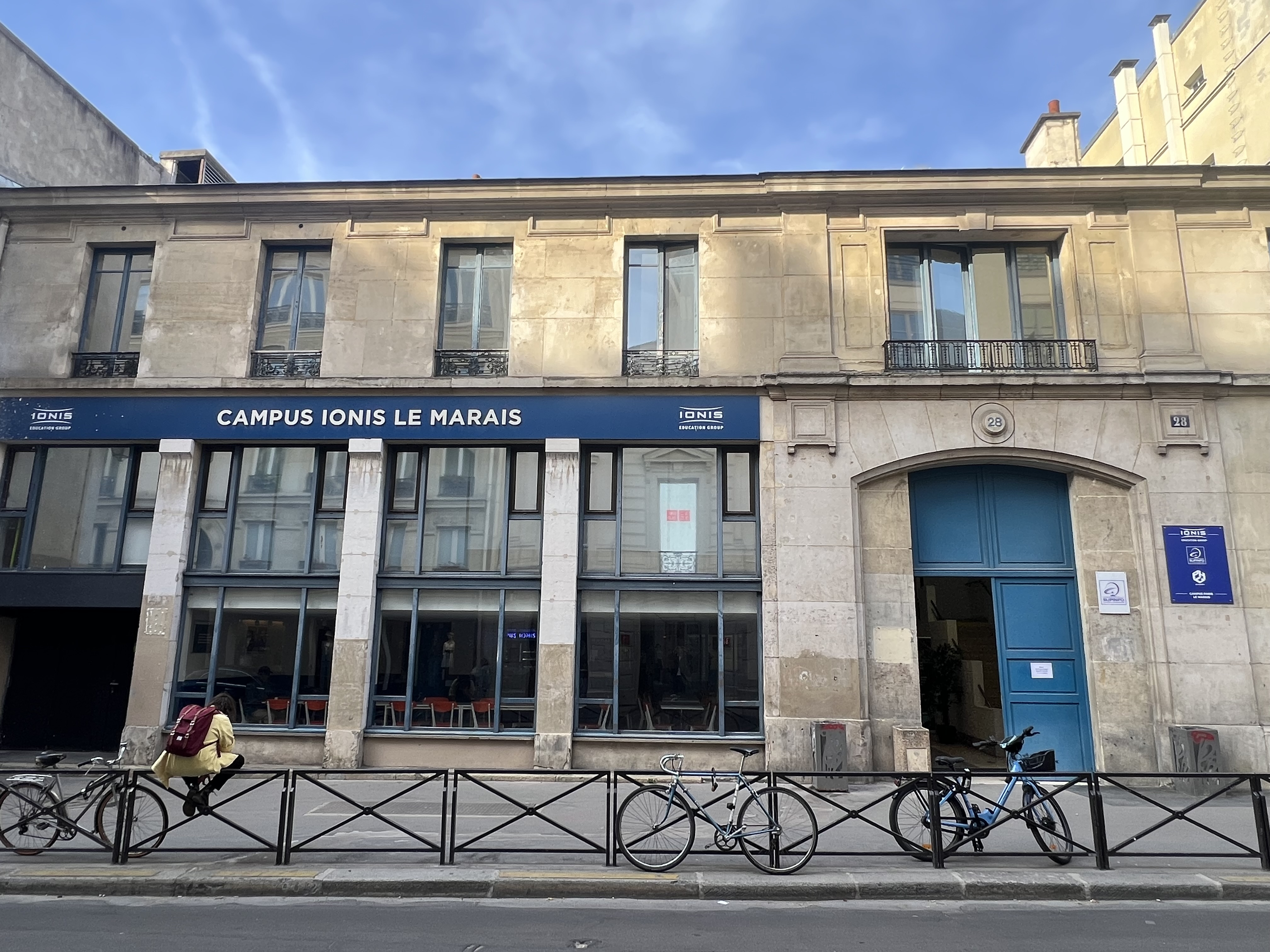
SUPINFO Paris campus

ESI was founded in 1965 by Léo Rozentalis.

The school was bought by an Alumnus, Alick Mouriesse, in 1998.

Since 2002 SUPINFO has signed agreements in Paris with three Chinese Universities to create three SUPINFO schools in China within the Computer Science faculties of universities from several regions in partnership with the French Chamber of Commerce and Industry in China. The students follow a course which is predominantly in English but they study French as well (8 hours per week) and at the end of the course, they are issued with the same qualification as the Parisian students.

In 2004, two new regional sites were opened in Strasbourg and Saint-Benoît, Réunion.

In 2005, seven new regional sites were opened in France : (Bordeaux, Mâcon, Nice, Nîmes, Saint-Malo, Troyes and Valenciennes).

In 2006, five new regional sites were opened in France : (Caen, Grenoble, Nantes, Toulouse and Tours) as well as SUPINFO UK in London and SUPINFO Canada in Montreal.

In 2007, five new regional sites were opened in France : (Clermont-Ferrand, Lille, Limoges, Lyon, Marseille, and Orléans). The site of Nîmes will be relocated and set up in Montpellier. A site is also opened in Peking.

In 2008, four new regional sites were opened in France : (Reims, Rennes, Metz and Guadeloupe) as well as SUPINFO Morocco in Casablanca and SUPINFO USA in San Francisco.

In 2009, three new international sites were opened in Belgium (Brussels), Italy (Catania) and Morocco (Rabat).

On 7 September 2011, the CNCP certification was renewed for five years.

In August 2020, the school is bought by IONIS Education Group after filing for bankruptcy. Only five sites remain operational, in Paris, Lille, Lyon, Tours, and Caen.

== Studies ==
The curriculum is a generalistic computer science one. All the 5 schools deliver the same degree, allowing the students to move from one geographical site to another if they wish to. It is also possible to attend classes in a different campus within the school year.

The study program is modelled on European engineering schools with integrated undergraduate and graduate studies: three years of integrated undergraduate cycle, then two years of graduate studies, all followed by internship programmes in businesses. However, students can also apply for a paid halftime internship throughout scholar year.

Admission requirements are French Baccalaureat S, STI or STL (or their international equivalents), and can also be made during the BAC+1, BAC+2 and BAC+3 levels after further education in Computer Science.

== Certificates ==
The training is validated by a diploma, registered by a national commission within the National Professional Certification Register (RNCP), after the decision of the National Professional Certification Commission (CNCP), at Level I.

In addition to the degree delivered by the school, all SUPINFO students will obtain official professional certificates from Microsoft, Oracle Corporation, Cisco, IBM, Sun Microsystems, Mandriva, Novell or Apple Inc. Though, the costs for the Microsoft, Cisco, Mandriva and Novell certifications are included in the school fees.

== Legal status ==
The school was a non-profit organisation in France. From 2009 to 2020 it was an SAS. In 2020, after filing for bankruptcy, Supinfo was bought by the for-profit S.A.S. (limited liability company) IONIS Education Group, which owns it since.

== Alumni ==
The following are SUPINFO graduates:

- Tristan Nitot (1989), founder of Mozilla Europe.
