= Hôtel de Ville, Le Kremlin-Bicêtre =

Town hall in Le Kremlin-Bicêtre, France

Hôtel de Ville
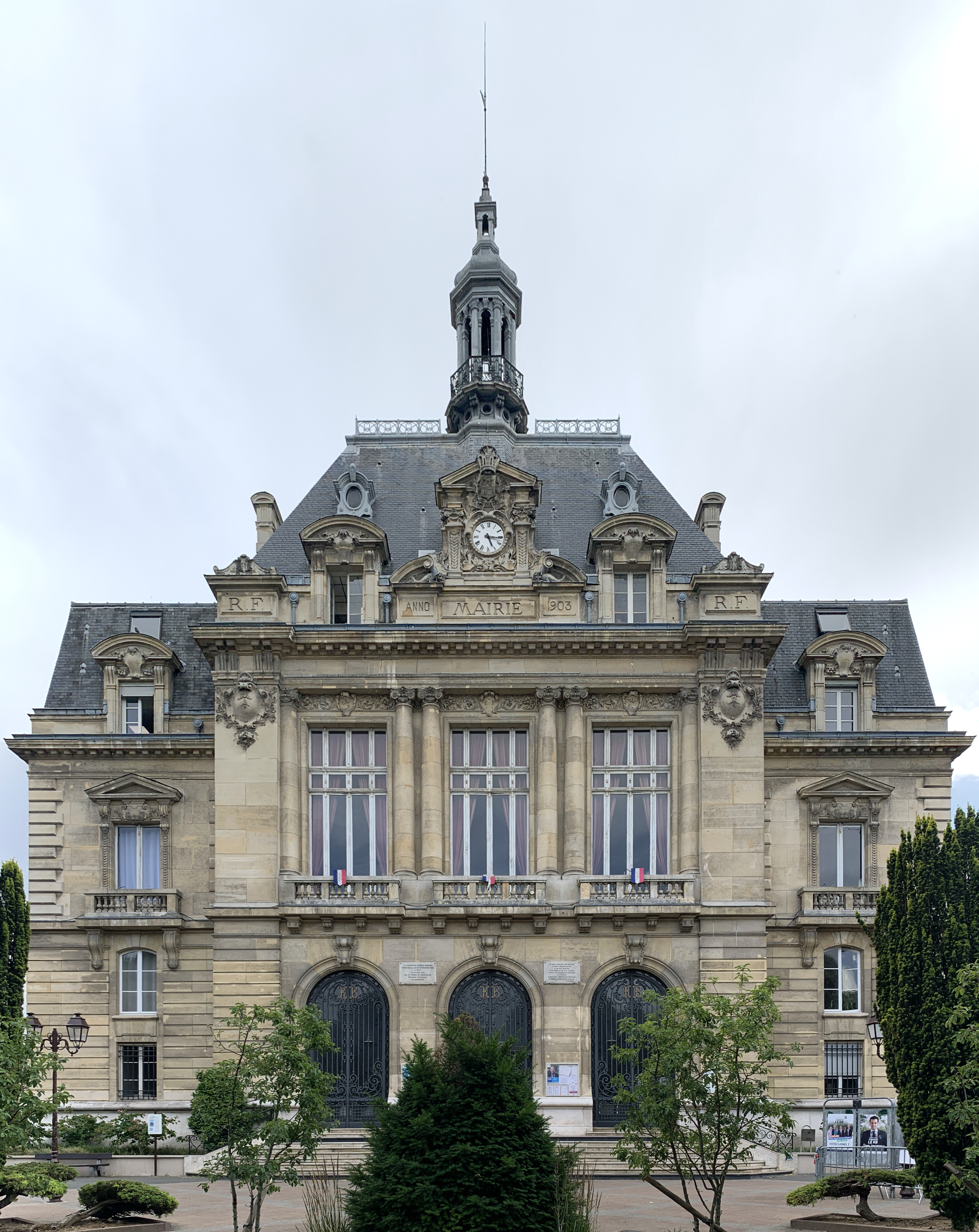
- The main frontage of the Hôtel de Ville in June 2020
- Interactive map of the Hôtel de Ville area

General information
- Type: City hall
- Architectural style: Neoclassical style
- Location: Le Kremlin-Bicêtre, France
- Coordinates: 48.8123°N 2.3569°E
- Completed: 1903

Design and construction
- Architect: Henri Rebersat

The Hôtel de Ville (French pronunciation: [otɛl də vil], City Hall) is a municipal building in Le Kremlin-Bicêtre, Val-de-Marne, in the southern suburbs of Paris, standing on Place Jean Jaurès. It has been included on the Inventaire général des monuments by the French Ministry of Culture since 1997.

== History ==
After the town of Le Kremlin-Bicêtre was separated from Gentilly in December 1896, the newly elected town council led by the mayor, Eugène Thomas, decided to commission a dedicated town hall. The site they selected was laid out with a new town square and surrounding streets. The new building was designed by Henri Rebersat in the neoclassical style, built in ashlar stone and completed in 1903.

The design involved a symmetrical main frontage of five bays facing onto the new town square. The central section of three bays, which was slightly projected forward, featured three round-headed openings with moulded surrounds and keystones. On the first floor, there were three tall casement windows, flanked by Ionic order columns and fronted by a balustraded balcony. The outer bays were fenestrated by vertically stacked bi-partite windows on the ground floor and by casement windows with pediments on the first floor, while the central section was flanked by full-height pilasters supporting an entablature and a modillioned cornice. At roof level, there was a clock above the central bay and dormer windows above the other bays. Behind the clock, there a steep roof and an octagonal belfry. The front of the building was augmented by fine sculptures carved by Sieur Forest. Internally, the principal rooms were the Salle du Conseil (council chamber) and the Salle des Mariages (wedding room).

In 1920, a stained glass window, intended to commemorate the lives of local service personnel who had died in the First World War, was created by the master glassmaker, Charles Champigneulle, and installed on the grand staircase inside the building. In August 1922, a plaque was unveiled on the front wall, on the left of the central opening, celebrating 25 years of socialist control. A second plaque was subsequently installed, on the right of central opening, commemorating Jean Jaurès's statement on the importance of defending of democracy and science. The wording was taken from one of his books published in 1911.

On 18 August 1944, part of the Second World War, a unit from the Francs-Tireurs et Partisans stormed the town hall: the mayor, Georges Gérard, was killed in the firefight. This was a week before the official liberation of the town by the French 2nd Armoured Division, commanded by General Philippe Leclerc, on 25 August 1944.
