= Concours Advance =

French engineering examination

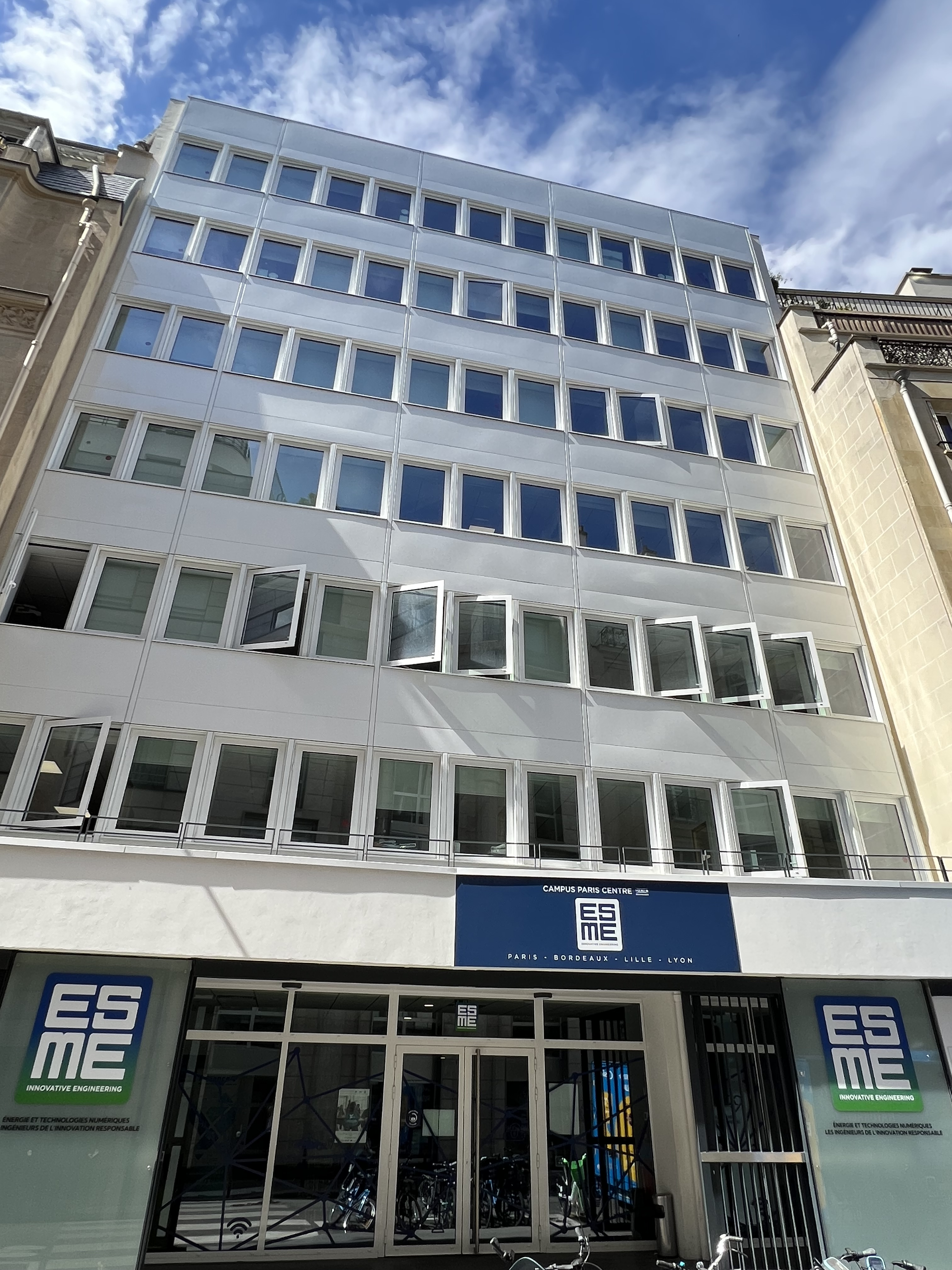
Concours Advance headquarters in Paris

In France, the concours Advance is a competitive examination to access to four main engineering grandes écoles:

- École pour l'informatique et les techniques avancées for computer science and software engineering;
- ESME-Sudria for energy;
- Institut polytechnique des sciences avancées for aeronautical and aerospace engineering.
- Institut Sup'Biotech de Paris for biotechnology.

== History ==
The examination has been created in 2011 by IONIS Education Group. Sup’Biotech joined it in 2016.
