= MOD'SPE Paris =

French private fashion school

- Institut supérieur spécialisé de la mode
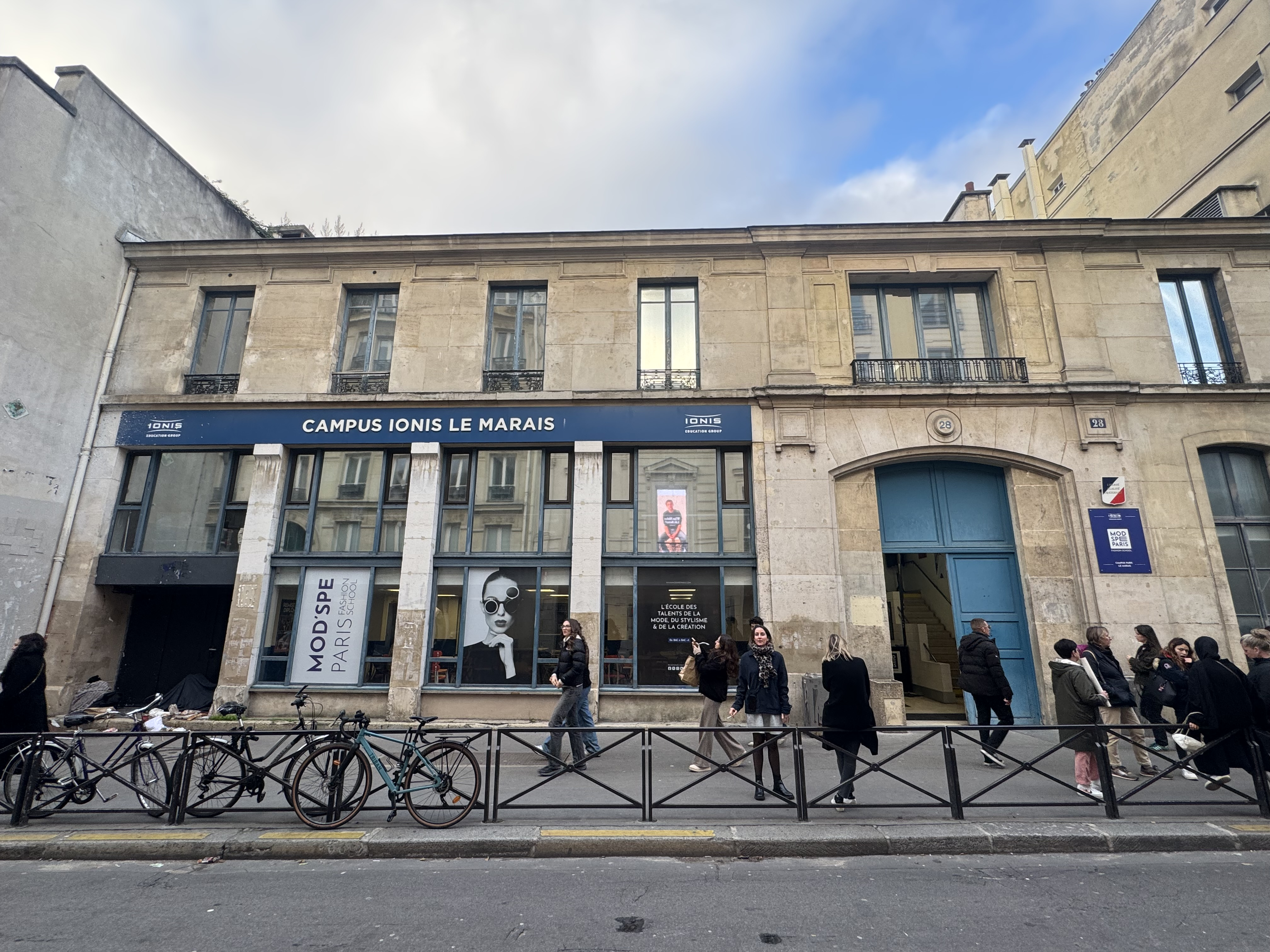
- Motto: L'école des talents de la mode, du stylisme et de la création
- Motto in English: The school for fashion, design and creative talent
- Established: 1993; 33 years ago
- Affiliations: IONIS Education Group
- President: Marc Sellam
- Dean: Sophie Cristini-Quintana
- Location: Paris, Lille, France; 48.8758139°N 2.3468082°E
- Campus: 28 Rue des Francs Bourgeois 75003 Paris
- Website: modspeparis.com

The MOD'SPE Paris, is a French fashion school founded in Paris in 1993 by the Fédération Française du Prêt-à-Porter Féminin. It has branches in Paris and Lille.

In March 2021 it joined IONIS Education Group, the main private group for higher education in France.

== Accreditation ==
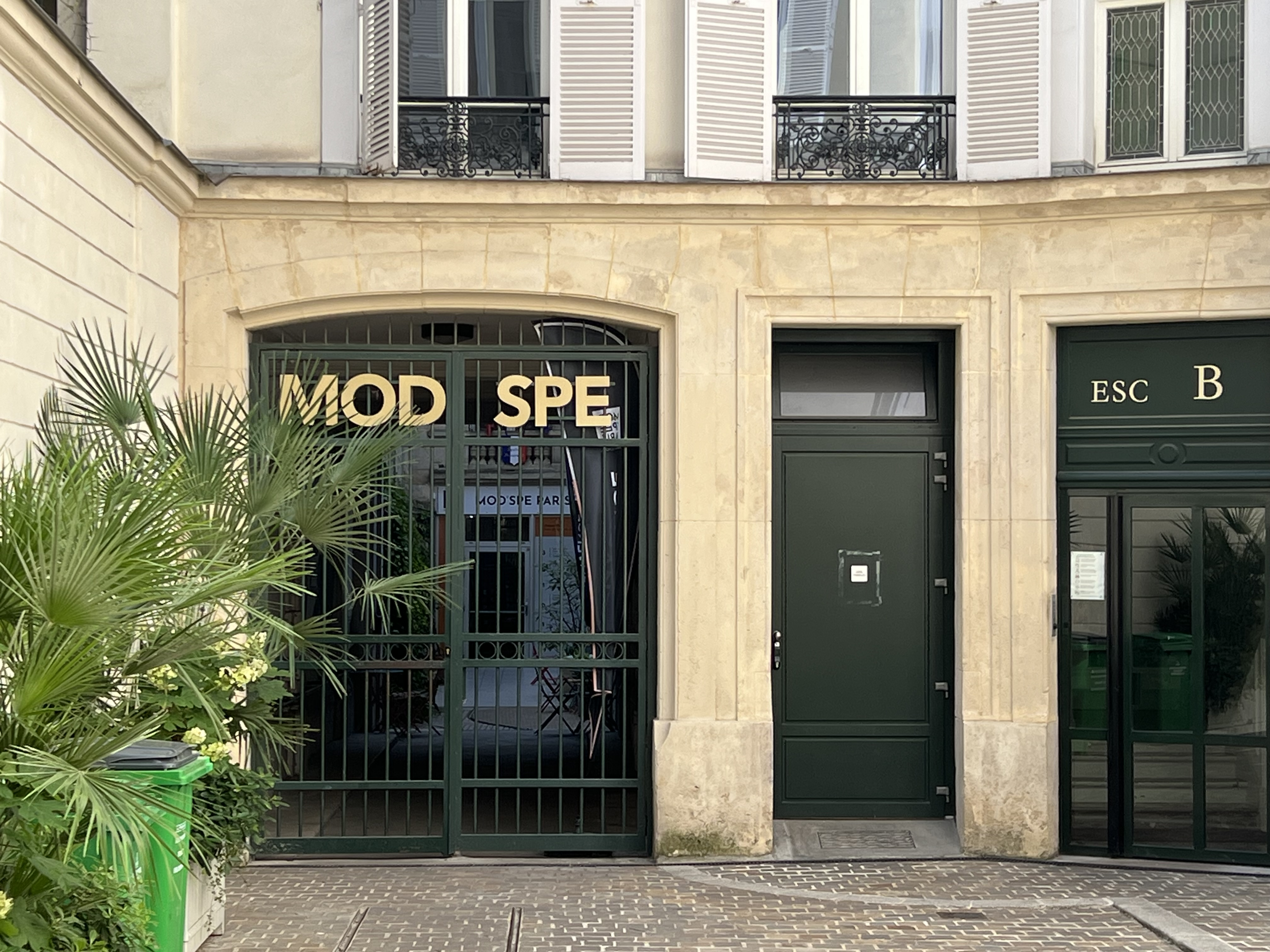
Historical campus of MOD’Spe in the 9th arrondissement of Paris

MOD'SPE Paris is authorised by the Commission nationale de la certification professionnelle, the French national commission for vocational certification, to award a five-year professional certification as fashion stylist/designer at level 6 of the European Qualifications Framework.
