= Institut supérieur européen de formation par l'action =

French private business school with multiple locations

Coordinates: 48°52′22″N 2°21′40″E

- Motto: Choose your job, we take care of your training
- Type: Private
- Established: 2000
- Affiliations: IONIS Education Group
- Location: Paris, France
- Website: http://www.isefac-bachelor.fr

The Institut supérieur européen de formation par l'action (ISEFAC) is a French private business school created in 2000.

== History ==
The school was created in 2000. The certification delivered by the school was recognized by the French State on 13 November 2009.

== Curriculum ==
=== ISEFAC Bachelor ===
ISEFAC Bachelor offers two courses, one in communication and the other in business marketing. They combine a degree with a professional option to choose from nine specialisations: event marketing, press relations / advertising and public, E-communication and communication for E-business, international business of sport, luxury businesses, environmental careers, bank business / marketing.

=== ISEFAC Dual education system ===
ISEFAC Dual education system proposes four courses: communication and business, administration, computer science and management.
