= Eliademy =

- Website type: Online education, e-learning
- Owner: CBTec
- Website: eliademy.com
- Registration: Required
- Users: 50000+ (April 2014)
- Launched: February 11, 2013; 13 years ago
- Current status: Offline

Eliademy [əlɪaˈdəmi] was a free online classroom that allowed educators and students to create, share and manage online courses with real-time discussions and task management. Eliademy was based on Moodle (support import in Moodle format), Bootstrap and other open source technologies. Eliademy was unveiled to public in February 2013 by CBTec. Eliademy was available in 32 languages.

== History ==
CBTec was founded in Helsinki, Finland in 2012 by Sotiris Makrygiannis and Sergey Gerasimenko. Following Nokia announcement on choosing Windows Phone as primary OS for its phones, Sotiris Makrygiannis, at the time Director of Open Source Operations, left together with 16 MeeGo colleagues. Their last project in Nokia was award-winning Nokia N9.

Eliademy Android client (also compatible with Moodle LMS) is an open-source project available at GitHub. It was launched with support from Tekes – the Finnish Funding Agency for Technology and Innovation. Eliademy is a part of Digile, Finland's initiative launched in order to create new disruptive digital service in the area of education.

In April 2014, Nordics VC company Inventure has completed an undisclosed seed investment in Eliademy. In June 2014, Eliademy launched a fully localized version in China.

Eliademy is based on the Open Source Moodle Virtual learning environment. The site is localized to more than 19 languages (including Latin), designed for mobile use.

== Recognition ==
Eliademy has been featured on TechCrunch. and in other sources. In June 2014, it was named by EdTech Europe as one of Europe's 20 fastest growing and most Innovative e-Learning companies. In February 2015 it was selected as Finalist for the 2015 Edison Awards in category "Living, Working and Learning" and received Gold Award during award ceremony in New York in April 2015.

== The end ==
Eliademy service discontinued December 2019 due to financial problems of CBTec.
