= JobTeaser =

French recruiting company

The JobTeaser logo.

JobTeaser is a French company that provides recruiting services to companies for the recruitment of young talent and a free career center software to higher education institutions in Europe. It was founded by Adrien Ledoux and Nicolas Lombard in 2008. Its head office is in the 9th arrondissement of Paris. As of January 2018, over 700.000 students and 500 universities used the service across Europe.

== History ==
=== Early steps ===
Adrien Ledoux and Nicolas Lombard created JobTeaser in 2008, with the aim of changing access to information about companies for young talents. From the beginning, they focused on students looking for an internship and recent graduates looking for their first job. The first goal of JobTeaser was to let companies make videos about them, their employees’ daily missions and their culture to help students in their career guidance.

=== First fundraising and business model changes ===
In 2013, JobTeaser created career centers that they implemented in French business and engineering schools. They used the institution’s branding and replaced its old career center with the JobTeaser platform. The first serviced institution was French business school ESSEC. The platform featured information about jobs and companies, as well as career advice and job and internship listings.

JobTeaser used a two-sided market approach by equipping one market for free and getting revenue streams from another market.

JobTeaser also launched a yearly “Employment Barometer”. In this report, they compared the jobs and industries that recruit the most and those that appeal to students and young graduates the most.

At the beginning of 2015, JobTeaser received 3 million euros in funding from Seventure Partners, with the aim of becoming a European leader for recruiting young talents. Later in the year, the company signed their first university intranet with the Université de Nantes.

=== Second fundraising and European expansion ===
As part of their European expansion, JobTeaser opened an office in Munich, Germany. As of May 2017, they were active in France, Germany, Belgium, the United Kingdom, Ireland, the Netherlands, Italy, Spain, Switzerland, and Luxembourg. They serviced 90% of the CAC 40 companies.

In May 2017, JobTeaser raised 15 million euros to speed up their international expansion. Their investors are Alven Capital, Idinvest Partners, Seventure Partners and Korelya Capital. Adrien Ledoux said that the funds would mostly be used for recruiting international business developers and expand beyond their active countries.

== Features ==
JobTeaser has a public website, as well as career center platforms for each of their institutional partners. These partners can share private information with their students, such as extra job offers or on-campus events.

On all platforms, JobTeaser offers video content about companies and jobs at these companies. The company’s revenue is based on paid deals with companies. Their main activity is multi-posting: a company can pay to target several universities using the Career Center and post only once on the whole system, therefore saving time.

== Corporate affairs ==
=== Human resources ===
In 2015, the company had 20 employees. At the end of 2016, the company had 70 employees. As of January 2019, the company has 200 employees.

The company won the Great Place to Work award in November 2016.
