= Moda Domani Institute =

Coordinates: 48°52′14.282″N 2°20′23.147″E

- Moda Domani Institute
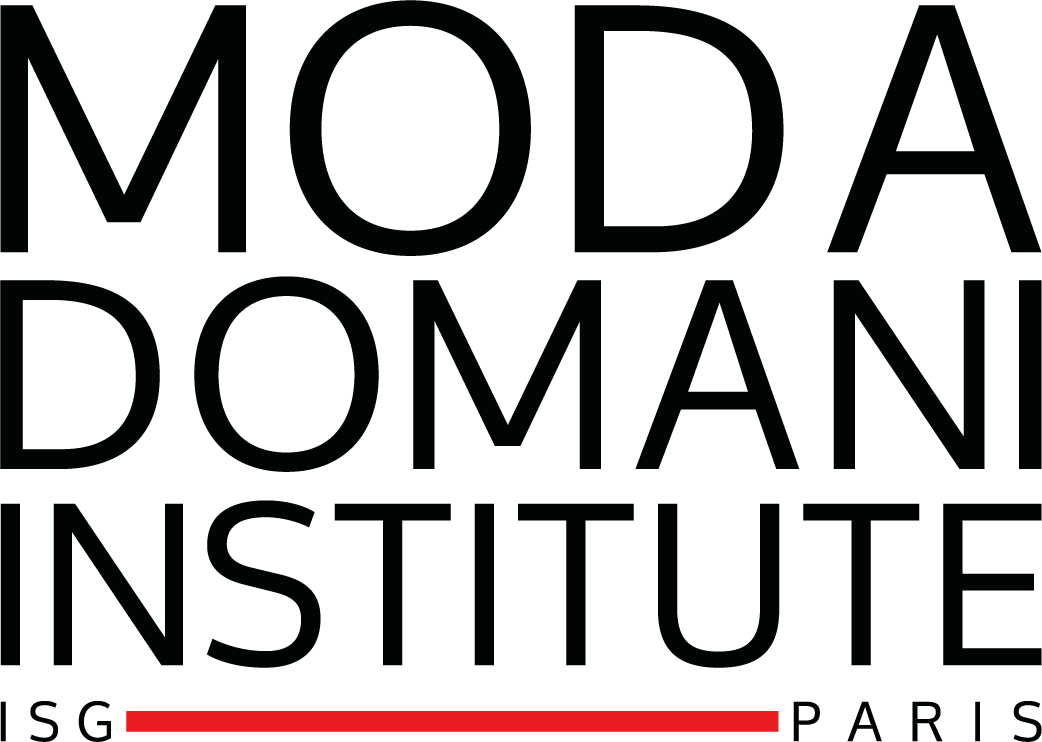
- Motto: La nouvelle business school spécialisée dans les nouveaux mondes du luxe, du design et de la mode
- Motto in English: The new business school specialized in the new worlds of luxury, design and fashion
- Type: Private
- Established: 2014
- President: Marc Sellam
- Location: Paris, France, France
- Website: www.modadomani.fr

Established in 2014 in Paris as a subsidiary of ISG Business School, Moda Domani Institute was one of the few business schools in France specialized in luxury, fashion and design. The business school was a member of the IONIS Education Group, the largest private group in France in terms of student population and endowment.

In UK, the university had a double-degree partnership with the Liverpool John Moores University.

The school closed in September 2020, replaced by ISG Luxury Management.
