= Mastère en sciences =

Type of postgraduate qualification

Master of Science
- Acronym: MSc
- Type: Master's degree
- Duration: 1 to 3 years (varies)
- Regions: France
- Prerequisites: Master's degree level 1

In France, the Master of Science (MSc) is a French degree in higher education accredited by the Conférence des Grandes Écoles and for owners of a Bachelor's degree or a first year (the Maîtrise diploma) of a Master's degree. Created in 2002, this degree certifies that the training is consistent with various quality criteria (selectivity, English language education, number of hours, length of program, research, etc..).

== Presentation ==
According to the rules of organization of training programs accredited by the Conférence des Grandes Écoles, ""The MSc ... of the School ..." is a program accredited by the Conférence des grandes écoles that certifies, according to criteria, of the quality of a comprehensive training package to international standards and taught in English."

Be considered candidates who hold a student of the following qualifications:

- First year of Master's degree or equivalent,
- Foreign degree, including Bachelor's degree.

Training must be attested by a diploma respecting the regulations applicable to the school which has received accreditation.

According to the rules, only the schools members of the Conférence des Grandes Écoles may issue the diploma.
