= National Classification of Levels of Training =

System to measure individual's training in France

The National Classification of Levels of Training (French: Nomenclature des niveaux de formation) is a system used in France for statistical purposes to measure an individual's training. Two classifications are commonly used: The nomenclature des niveaux de formation (national classification of levels of training), established in 1969 by the Commission statistique nationale (national statistical commission), and the International Standard Classification of Education (ISCED), validated by UNESCO in 1997 and used for international comparisons.

The first one is used by the Ministry of National Education, but also by the French employment agency, to classify jobseekers by education level, and by INSEE for the census, ...

The issue of classification reform arises from European degrees harmonization, including the phasing of final diplomas of undergraduate higher education (level III). However, even after the phasing, there are still many graduates. Thus, although the Certificat d'études primaires was officially abolished in 1989, which does not prevent to find today, in the French population, individuals who had stopped at this level of training.

== National classification of levels of training (1967) ==
It defines the levels of training in terms of duration.

=== Level VI ===
Staff with a job which not requires training beyond compulsory schooling.

=== Level V Bis ===
Staff with a job assuming a specialized training for a maximum of one year beyond the first cycle of secondary education, level of the certificat de formation professionnelle (vocational training certificate).

=== Level V ===
Staff with a job normally requiring a level of training equivalent to the Brevet d'études professionnelles (BEP) (two years of education beyond the first cycle of secondary education) and to the Certificat d'aptitude professionnelle (CPC ). Provisionally, the training of the National diploma acquired.

=== Level IV ===
==== IV a ====
Staff with a job normally requiring a Baccalauréat, a brevet de technician (BT), a brevet supérieur d'enseignement commercial (BSEC) (three years of education beyond the first cycle of secondary education) . Provisionally, a brevet d'enseignement industrial (EIB), a brevet d'enseignement commercial (BEC).

==== IV b ====
Staff holding a brevet professionnel or a brevet de maîtrise (two years of training minimum and professional practice after acquiring a level V degree).

=== Level III ===
Staff with a job normally requiring training a Brevet de technician supérieur (technician's diploma), a Diplôme universitaire de technologie, or end of the first cycle of higher education (three years of post-baccalaureat education since the reform aimed for a European harmonization of higher education)

=== Levels I and II ===
Staff with a job normally requiring training of equal or higher than that of the grandes écoles or Bachelor.

== National classification of levels of training (1969) ==
Built in reference to the one of 1967, this classification refers to a skill level (responsibility in employment).

=== Level V ===
Staff with a job normally requiring a level of training equivalent to the brevet d'études professionnelles (BEP) or the certificat d'aptitude professionnelle (CAP), and by equivalence, of the certificat de formation professionnelle des adultes (CFPA).

This level corresponds to a full qualification for the practice of a specific activity, with the ability to use instruments and techniques relating thereto. This activity involves chiefly the performance of a work which may be independently conduct within the limits of the techniques related thereto.

=== Level IV ===
Staff with a jobs of control or highly skilled worker and can attest a level of training equivalent to that of the brevet professionel (BP), the brevet de technicien (BT), a Baccalauréat professionel or a Baccalauréat technologique.

A degree of level IV requires more theoretical knowledge than the previous level. This activity involves chiefly technical work which can be performed independently and/or entail executive coaching (control).

=== Level III ===
Staff with a jobs that normally requires a Diplôme universitaire de technologie (DUT) or a Brevet de technicien supérieur (BTS) or end of undergraduate higher education. A degree of Level III corresponds to the knowledge and skills level, though lacking the knowledge of the scientific basis of the areas concerned. Capabilities and knowledge required ensure to be able to work autonomously or independently responsibilities of design and/or coaching and/or management.

=== Level II ===
Staff with a middle management job that normally requires a training of a Bachelor's degree level or a first-year Master's degree level.

At this level, the practice of an employment contract or independent means knowing the scientific foundations of the job, generally leading to autonomy in carrying out this activity.

=== Level I ===
Staff with a middle management job that normally requires a training above the first-year Master's degree level.

In addition to strong knowledge of scientific basis of the job, a level I requires knowledge of process design and research.
