= ESME-Sudria =

French private grande école

Coordinates: 48°42′30″N 2°09′50″E

- ex-École Spéciale de Mécanique et d'Électricité
- Motto: École d'ingénieurs de tous les possibles
- Type: Private science & engineering school (Grande École)
- Established: 1905
- Affiliations: IONIS Education Group, Concours Advance, Elles Bougent, CDEFI, ASTech, CGE, Medicen, UGEI
- President: Marc Sellam
- Dean: Véronique Bonnet
- Location: Ivry-sur-Seine (Paris), Lille, Bordeaux and Lyon, Île-de-France, Nord-Pas-de-Calais, Rhône-Alpes, Aquitaine, FR
- Website: esme.fr

The École Spéciale de Mécanique et d'Electricité (English: Special School of Mechanics and Electricity), also known as ESME Sudria, is a French private grande école founded in 1905. It is a part of the IONIS Education Group.

Founded in 1905 by Joachim Sudria and certified by the State since 1922, the diploma is signed by the French Education Ministry and authorized by the "Commission des titres d'ingénieur". The ESME-Sudria is also member of the "Conférence des Grandes Écoles" and of the Union of Independent Grandes Écoles.

The school graduates students at different levels:

- Bachelor of Science
- Master of Engineering certified by the Order of Engineers
- PhD (cooperation with University of Paris-Est Marne-la-Vallée or University of Paris-Saclay)

Since 2006, the school has been part of the IONIS Institute of Technology from IONIS Education Group.

== Alumni ==
- Marie-Louise Paris (1921), founder of the EPF in 1925

== ESME Sudria Foundation ==
Founded in 2011 by Alstom, Engie Ineo, Eiffage, Technip et the association of ESME Sudria Engineers, with funds from the Fondation de France, ESME Sudria stands out among French engineering schools in that it strives to favour social diversity among its student body. The school notably offers study grants to students from financially disadvantaged backgrounds. Notable recipients have included France's 2015 Youth Cultural Ambassador, Antonin Houssière, and 2020 Olympic archer Alexandre Marie.
