= E-Artsup =

French university specialized in digital media

Coordinates: 48°51′58.28″N 2°22′24.195″E

e-artsup
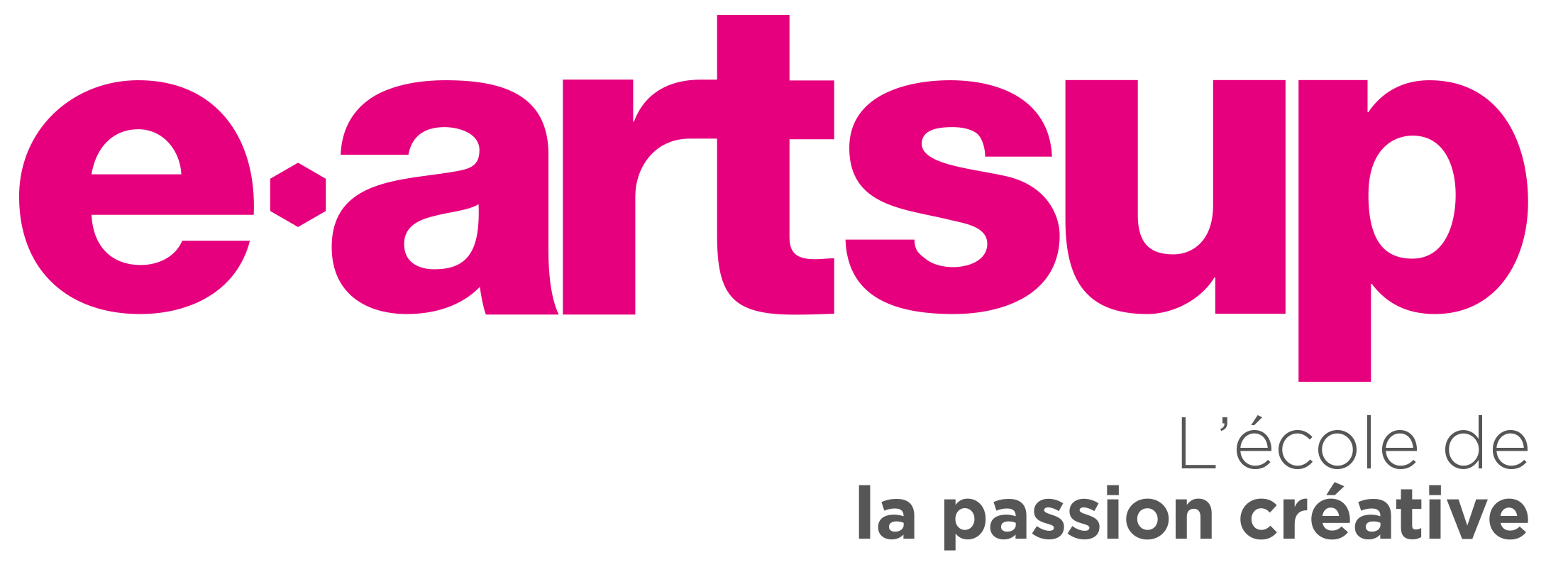
- Motto: L'école de la passion créative
- Type: For profit
- Established: 2001
- Affiliations: IONIS Education Group
- Directeur général: Nicolas Becqueret
- Students: 2500
- Location: Paris, Bordeaux, Lyon, Nice Nantes, Lille, Montpellier, Tours, Toulouse, Strasbourg, France
- Website: e-artsup.net

e-artsup is a French private school created in 2001 and specialized in digital creativity, animation, Video games, Motion design, art director and multimedia. The school is located at Paris, Bordeaux, Lyon, Nantes, Nice, Montpellier, Strasbourg, Toulouse, Tours and Lille and is part of IONIS Education Group. The school delivers degrees recognized by French state which last five years. There are approximately 400 graduates per year. It is one of the only universities in France to specialize in digital creativity and multimedia.

In April 2015, a new digital and innovative campus has opened in Paris (Le Marais-Bastille) bringing together the ISEG, Sup'Internet, Epitech Digital and e-artsup.

== Curriculum ==
The school provides four programs : Art direction, Motion Design, Animation 2D/3D & Game Design

- A five-year course in digital creativity. The first two years focus on the acquisition of basic knowledge of drawing: academic drawing, life model drawing, analytical drawing, perspective, and computer graphics. During the third year, students learn subjects such as 3D creativity, web design, graphic arts, photography, identity design, creative advertising, typography and motion design. During the last two years of the curriculum, students choose an area of specialization among communication, animation, motion design, concept art, design digital & business, game design and interactive design.

== Rankings ==
In the 2025 The Rookies World School Rankings, e-artsup was ranked 12th globally out of 489 participating institutions worldwide. The school achieved several top-tier distinctions in specific categories, including:

- Graphic Design: Ranked 3rd worldwide and 1st in Europe (2025).
- Motion Graphics: Ranked 1st in Europe and 1st in France (2023).
- 2D Animation: Consistently ranked within the Top 10 schools globally.

These rankings are based on the quality of student portfolios, technical expertise, and industry employability assessments conducted by professional judges.
