= France Université Numérique =

French national platform

France université numérique
- France université numérique
- Website type: Online education
- Available in: French
- Owner: GIP FUN-MOOC
- Website: www.fun-mooc.fr
- Commercial: No
- Registration: Required
- Launched: 2 October 2013; 12 years ago
- Current status: Active

France université numérique (FUN) is the French national platform to promote the use of massive open online courses (MOOCs).

The portal is supported by the American open edX open source platform, and supported by Google since September 2013. The audiovisual content is hosted on OVH servers.

At its launch, the platform was endowed by the government, a budget of eight million euros.

== Categories ==
There are 39 categories available on the platform. A MOOC may overlap multiple categories.

- Agronomie et agriculture (Agronomy and agriculture)
- Chimie (Chemistry)
- Communication (Communication)
- Création, arts et design (Creation, arts and design)
- Cultures et civilisations (Cultures and civilizations)
- Découverte de l'Univers (Discovery of the Universe)
- Développement durable (Sustainable development)
- Droit et juridique (Law and legal studies)
- Économie et finance (Economics and finance)
- Éducation et formation (Education and tutoring)
- Enjeux de société (Social issues)
- Entrepreneuriat (Entrepreneurship)
- Environnement (Environment)
- Géographie (Geography)
- Histoire (History)
- Informatique (Information technology)
- Innovation (Innovation)
- Langues (Languages)
- Lettres (Literature and writing)
- Management (Management)
- Mathématiques et statistiques (Mathematics and statistics)
- Médias (Media studies)
- Numérique, technologie (Data science)
- Outils pour la recherche (Research tools)
- Philosophie (Philosophy)
- Physique (Physics)
- Programmation (Programming)
- Relations internationales (International relations)
- Réseaux et télécommunications (Networks and telecommunications)
- Santé (Health science)
- Sciences (Science)
- Sciences cognitives (Cognitive Sciences)
- Sciences de la terre et de l'univers (Earth, planetary, and astronomical Sciences)
- Sciences de la vie (Life sciences)
- Sciences humaines et sociales (Humanities and social sciences)
- Sciences politiques (Political sciences)
- Sciences pour l'ingénieur (Engineering)
- Sport (Sport)
- Vie de l'entreprise (Business)
