= École pour l'informatique et les techniques avancées =

French institute of higher learning

Coordinates: 48.815586°N 2.362908°E

EPITA School of Engineering and Computer Science
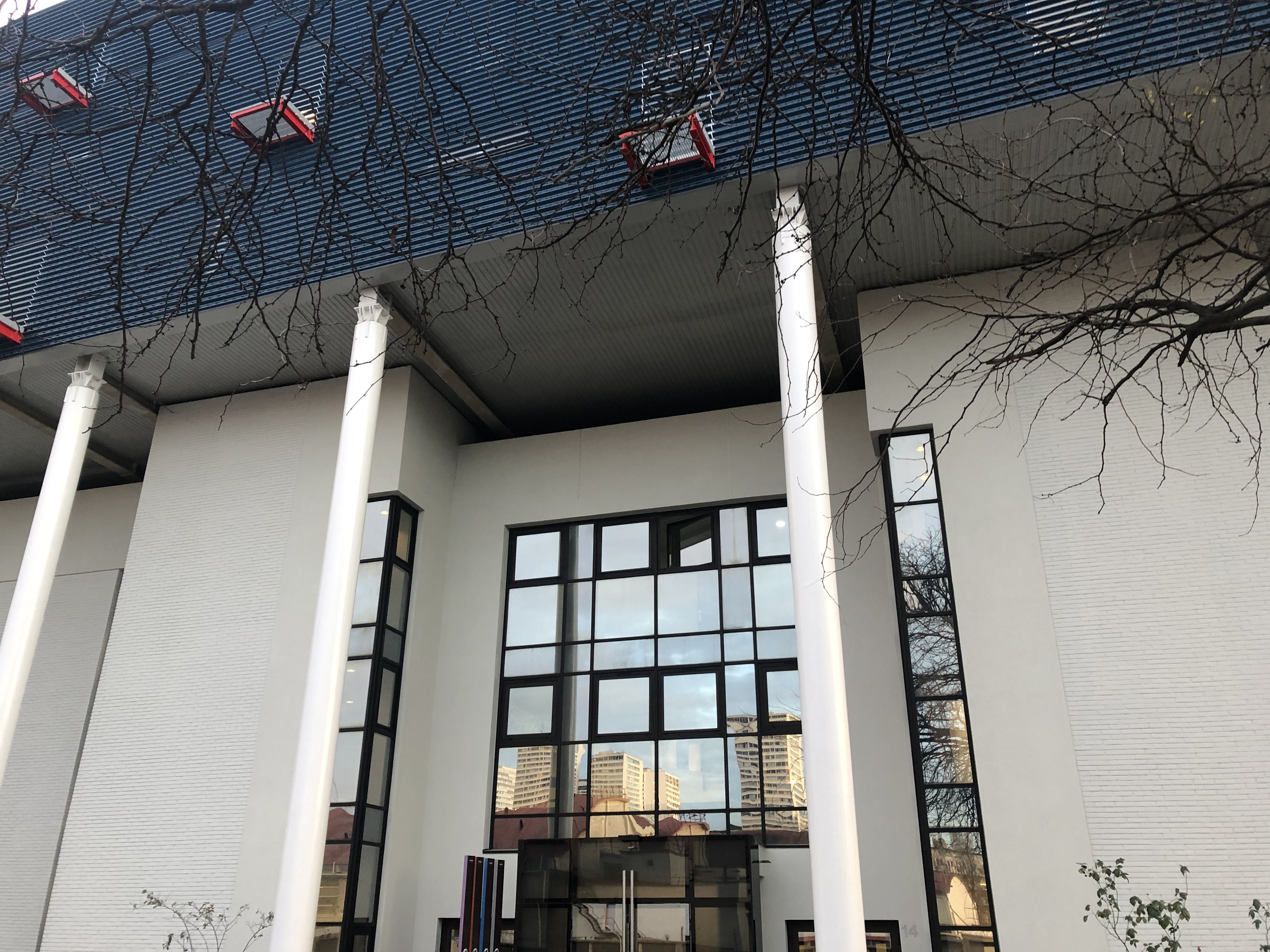
- Motto: Digital Intelligence
- Motto in English: Computer science and information technology
- Type: Private, Grande École
- Established: 1984
- Founder: Patrice Dumoucel
- Affiliations: IONIS Education Group, CGE, Concours Advance, Elles Bougent, Cap Digital, Systematic Paris-Region
- President: Marc Sellam
- Location: Le Kremlin-Bicêtre, Lyon, Rennes, Strasbourg, Toulouse, France
- Campus: Le Kremlin-Bicêtre, Villejuif, La Défense
- Website: www.epita.fr/en/

The École Pour l'Informatique et les Techniques Avancées (English: EPITA School of Engineering and Computer Science), more commonly known as EPITA, is a private French grande école specialized in the field of computer science and software engineering created in 1984 by Patrice Dumoucel. It is a private engineering school, member of IONIS Education Group since 1994, accredited by the Commission des titres d'ingénieur (CTI) to deliver the French Diplôme d'Ingénieur, and based at Le Kremlin-Bicêtre south of Paris.

In June 2013, EPITA becomes member of the Union of Independent Grandes Écoles, which includes 30 grandes écoles.

The school is part of IONIS Education Group.

== Studies ==
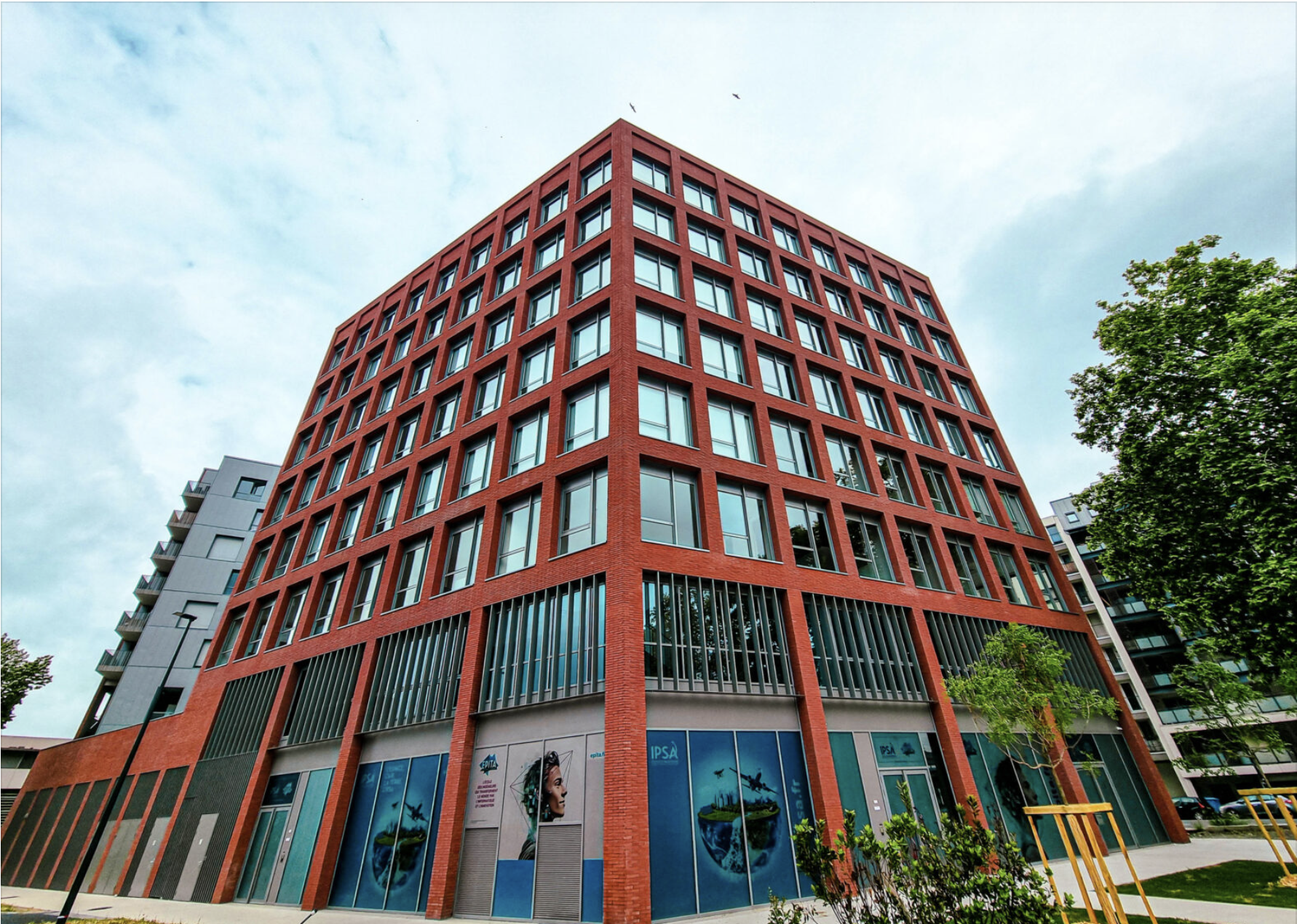
EPITA Toulouse campus

=== Preparatory class ===
The first two years of studies are preparatory years. During these two years, students study mathematics, physics and electronics as well as algorithmics and computer science.

=== Engineering class ===
==== The first year ====
The third year is the first year of engineering studies, where students learn the fundamentals in information technology and software engineering. This year is also famous for its first month, during which students will be asked to make several projects, which generally lead them to code more than 15 hours per day. Third year students are known to say that "sleeping is cheating" and usually remember this year as their most painstaking year at EPITA.

==== Majors ====
During the fourth and fifth years students have to choose one of the nine majors:

- IMAGE, Traitement et synthèse d'image ("Image processing and synthesis")
- SRS, Systèmes, Réseaux et Sécurité ("Systems, Networks and Security")
- MTI, Multimédia et Technologies de l'Information ("Multimedia and Information Technology")
- SCIA, Sciences Cognitives et Informatique Avancée ("Cognitive Science and Advanced Computer Science")
- QUANTUM, Quantum Computing & Quantum Technologies ("Quantum")
- SANTÉ, Data science généraliste (General data science)
- GISTRE, Génie Informatique des Systèmes Temps Réel et Embarqués ("Computer Engineering, Real-time Systems and Embedded System")
- SIGL, Systèmes d’Information et Génie Logiciel ("Information Systems and Software Engineering")
- TCOM, Télécommunications ("Telecommunication")
- GITM, Global IT Management (Entirely taught in English)
- RECHERCHE, (Majeure double compétence orientée vers la recherche académique)
