= ISG Business School =

Business school in Paris

Coordinates: 48°52′01″N 2°16′47″E

Institut supérieur de gestion
- Type: Business school
- Established: 1967
- Affiliations: UNIDO-UNESCO, AACSB, EFMD, CGE, IONIS Education Group, UGEI
- Location: Paris, New York, Tokyo, France
- Campus: Urban
- Website: www.isg.fr

The ISG business school or Institut Superieur de Gestion, is a business school based in Paris, France.

It was founded in 1967 by a group of French CEOs led by Pierre-Alexandre Dumas.

In 1983, ISG opened its own campuses in New York and Tokyo. Today, ISG is associated with more than 160 universities across 5 continents.

ISG delivers BBAs and MBAs.

== History ==
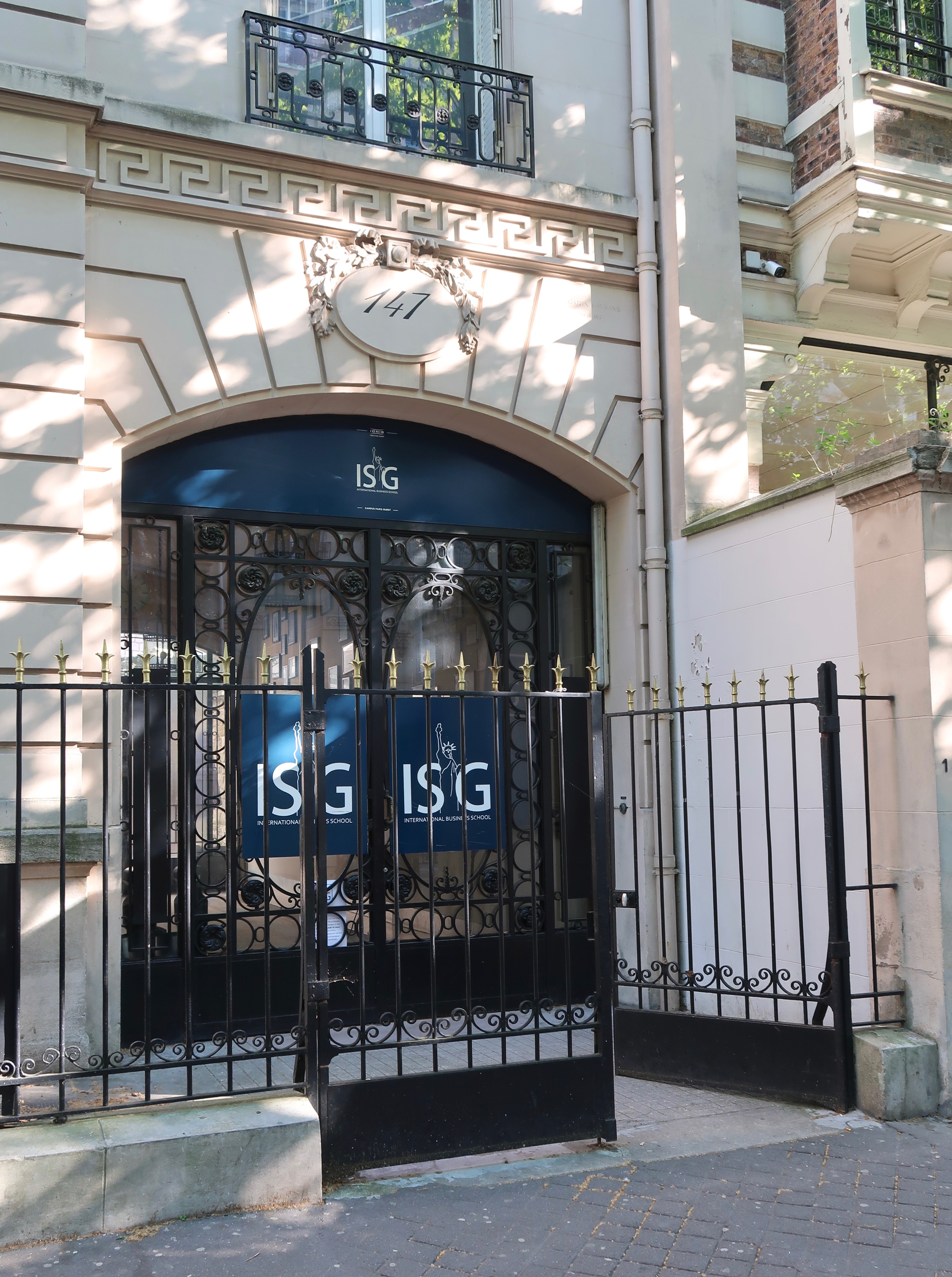
Entrance to the ISG, 147 avenue Victor-Hugo in Paris.

The entrance to ISG, located at 147 avenue Victor-Hugo in Paris.

ISG Paris was founded in 1967. In 1982 and 1984, the campuses of Tokyo and New York City were inaugurated. The university concluded its first partnership with China in 1985. In 1997, the university joined the IONIS Education Group. In 2004, its diploma was recognized by French Ministry of National Education, and the university was accredited by IACBE before becoming a member of UNIDO in 2006. In 2007, the university was accredited by ACBSP before being recognized by the French State to award a Master's degree in 2009. The same year, the school became a member of AACSB. On 10 April 2012, the ISG became a member of the Conférence des grandes écoles.

Since 2013, IONIS Education Group has aimed to develop daytime and evening programs for employees provided by companies by developing programs based on the 11 Master of Business Administration degrees of the university. It has a double degree agreement with the EAN University of Bogotá, Colombia.

In 2014, ISG Business School launched a subsidiary specialized in luxury, fashion and design called Moda Domani Institute. known as ISG Luxury Management.
