= University of Évry Paris-Saclay =

French public university

University of Évry Paris-Saclay'
- Université Évry Paris-Saclay
- Type: Public
- Established: 1991
- Affiliations: Paris-Saclay University
- Budget: €126 M
- Chancellor: Christophe Kerrero (Q97601994) (2020-)
- President: Vincent Bouhier (Q118383438)
- Academic staff: 591
- Administrative staff: 394
- Total staff: 985
- Students: 10,277
- Undergraduates: 7,567
- Postgraduates: 2,536
- Doctoral students: 174
- Location: Boulevard François Mitterrand, Évry-Courcouronnes, Île-de-France, 91000, France
- Campus: Urban
- Language: English and French
- Website: www.univ-evry.fr

The University of Évry Paris-Saclay (French:Université Évry Paris-Saclay; UEPS), formerly University of Évry Val-d'Essonne, is a public university located in Évry-Courcouronnes, Île-de-France, France. It merged with the Paris-Saclay University in 2025.

== Overview ==
UEVE university founded in 1991 (by Decree), is located in a ville nouvelle which is dynamic and constantly evolving. The city of Évry-Courcouronnes is home to many firms (Accor, Carrefour etc.), the largest mall in Île-de-France and a national theatre.

Just 45 minutes away from Paris by RER, Évry is near the countryside. The Forest of Fontainebleau is only 21 miles (35 kilometres) away.

There are more than 160 curricula from two-year undergraduate degrees to the doctoral level, over half of which are professionally oriented. The university offers courses in Science, Technology, Law, Economics, Management and Social Sciences.

Today, the university counts more than 10,000 students (data july 2023) in both initial and ongoing training and the university has built a reputation as a center of excellence.

Thanks to 19 laboratories and 9 doctoral schools, the university is also a significant research centre developing major projects, in particular, those concerning Biology in conjunction with the French National Sequencing Center (Genoscope).

The university is a member of UniverSud Paris, Cap Digital, Systematic Paris-Region, ASTech, Medicen, and Finance Innovation and an associate member of the University of Paris-Saclay.

== Academics ==
=== Unité de Formation et de Recherche (UFR) ===
The Savary Law of 1984 restructured academic departments in French universities. Each department was made into a UFR, "Unité de formation et de recherche" or Research and Formation Unit that offers both undergraduate and graduate programs. Each UFR of the university is governed by a director elected from the department and heads over a council of elected professors who control its curriculum.

- Law and Political Science
- Social Sciences of Management
  - Management - Administration Economic and Social
  - History
  - Sociology
  - Economy
- Languages, Arts and Music
  - Arts - Music
  - Applied Foreign Languages
- Fundamental and Applied Sciences
  - Biology
  - Chemistry
  - Computer
  - Mathematics
  - Physical
  - Science and Technology of Sports and Physical Activities
- Science and Technology
  - Science and Technology
  - Engineering Sciences

=== University Institute of Technology ===
- Marketing Techniques
- Thermal Engineering and Energy
- Business Management and Administration
- Mechanical and Production Engineering
- Logistics and Transport Management
- Electrical Engineering and Computer Engineering
- Science and Engineering
- Quality, Industrial Logistics and Organisation

=== Doctoral Schools ===
Nationally assessed laboratories and research teams support Doctoral Schools which are based on one or several fields of study. In addition to high-level training in a discipline, the Doctoral Schools assist future doctors in the preparation of their careers by creating bridges between private enterprise and the economic environment.

- "Structure and Dynamics of Living Systems"
- "Mathematics"
- "Law, Economics, Management"
- "Mechanical and Energy Sciences, Materials and Geosciences"
- "Therapeutic Innovation Doctoral School: from Fundamental to Applied"
- "Information and Communication Sciences and Technology"
- "Chemical Sciences: Molecules, Materials, Instrumentation and Biosystem"
- "Sports, Motor and Human Movement Sciences"
- "Social Sciences and Humanities"

=== Research laboratories and units ===
==== Humanities and Society ====
- INSTITUTIONS AND HISTORICAL DYNAMICS OF THE ECONOMY & SOCIETY
- LABORATORY IN INNOVATION, TECHNOLOGY, ECONOMY & MANAGEMENT
- SLAM - Synergies Languages Arts Music
- RASM-CHCSC - Musicology and Cultural history
- PIERRE NAVILLE CENTER
- CENTER FOR ECONOMIC POLICY STUDIES
- "Leon Duguit" Center for the Study of the new law changes
- ANHIMA - Anthropology and History of Ancient Worlds (As an associated laboratory)

==== Life Sciences ====
- LABORATORY OF EXERCISE BIOLOGY FOR PERFORMANCE AND HEALTH (LBEPS)
- STRUCTURE ACTIVITY OF NORMAL & PATHOLOGICAL BIOMOLECULES - [SABNP]
- EUROPEAN RESEARCH LABORATORY FOR RHEUMATOID ARTHRITIS - [GenHotel]
- Laboratory Analysis, Modeling, and Materials for Biology and the Environment
- PARIS SACLAY PLANTS INSTITUTE - [IPS2]
- Metabolic Genomics
- Institute of Stem Cells for the Treatment and Study of Monogenic Diseases (I-STEM)
- INTEGRATED GENETIC APPROACHES & NEW THERAPIES FOR RARE DISEASES - [INTEGRARE]

==== Science and Technologies of Information and Communication ====
- Computing, Integrative Biology and Complex Systems (IBISC)

==== Basic Sciences and Engineering ====
- EVRY MATHEMATICAL & MODELING LABORATORY - [LAMME]
- EVRY MECHANICS & ENERGY LABORATORY - [LMEE]

== International relations ==
The University of Évry has established links with many foreign universities. The agreements allow for exchanges of both students and professors. They concern the five continents.

Member of exchanges programmes : Erasmus (EU), MICEFA (USA) and CREPUQ (Quebec).

== Visual identity ==
The university is currently using this logo:

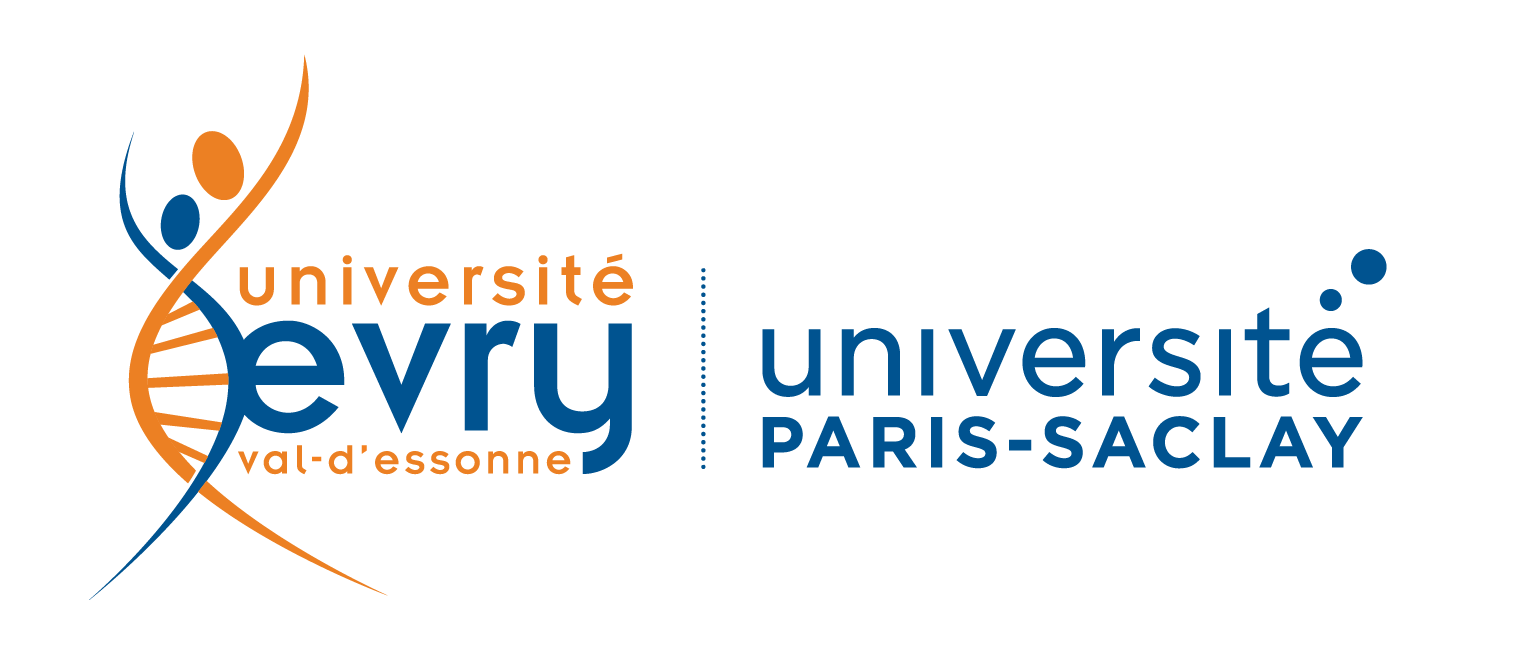
Logo of the Université d'Évry-Val d'Essonne

Before it started to merge with Paris-Saclay University, the university had this simpler version :

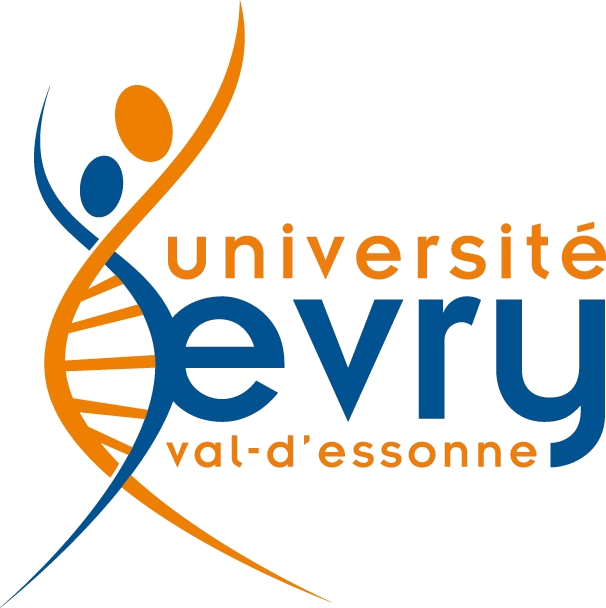
Former logo of the Évry-Val d'Essonne University

Way before all of this, the university was using a really different logo :

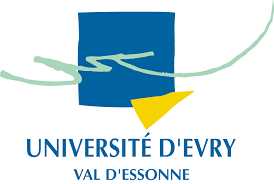
Former logo of the Université d'Évry-Val d'Essonne

== Notable people ==
- Professor Karine Saporta
- Professor Olivier Le Cour Grandmaison
- Professor Michel Caboche
- Professor Jérôme Glachant
- Professor Jean-Pierre Durand
- Professor Véronique Billat

=== Alumni ===
- Cyprien Verseux, Astrobiologist
