= Île-de-France Clusters =

The Ile-de-France has eight clusters among 71 approved by the Comité interministériel d'aménagement et de développement du territoire (CIADT, Interdepartmental Committee on Planning and Land Development). The first four were approved by the CIACT 14 October 2005. Two others were validated in July 2007: the cluster Finance Innovation and ASTech. Each of these clusters is intended to create jobs and increase the attractiveness of the region in a given area at national or international level. Three of them were selected as "worldwide clusters" : Finance Innovation, Systematic Paris-Region and Medicen. Three have been identified as "clusters which will become worldwide" : Cap Digital and MOV'EO. Advancity is a "national cluster".

== Systematic ==
Systematic Paris-Region is a cluster of Ile-de-France, created in 2005, dedicated to complex systems with more than 600 innovative players.

More than 600 organizations are involved in the R & D network of the cluster: 366 SMEs-SMBs, 116 major companies, 24 ETI, 79 research centers and educational institutions, 19 local authorities and 15 investors. The cluster brings together beyond the R & D collaborative, an ecosystem of 1060 innovative SMEs.

The technological heart of the cluster brings together information technology and communication and the Design Tools and Development Systems to design, develop, operate and manage the infrastructure, systems and equipment specify to dedicated markets of the cluster. The software is the main technology with, since 2007, a proactive strategy in the field of free software in order to bring together stakeholders in their communities in Île-de-France and to promote the emergence of a thriving industry free software.

== Medicen ==
Medicen is a project submitted by the Regional Development Paris-Ile-de-France Agency with the activity of health, including infectious diseases, neuroscience and cancer. This cluster aims to increase by 50% the number of jobs in the field of life sciences and to attract at least two major pharmaceutical laboratory in research and development.

== Cap Digital, the cluster for digital content and services ==
Cap Digital has more than 600 members of the industry of digital content and services: 530 SMEs, 20 major groups, 50 universities and grandes écoles involving 170 research laboratories. The cluster covers nine subjects: education and digital training, video game, the knowledge engineering, culture and media, sound and interactivity, services and uses mobiles, robotics and communicating objects, digital design, free software, cooperation and new models.

To support creativity and competitiveness of the industrial sector which represents a global market of 300 billion euros, Cap Digital carries out actions following six main areas: the development of R&D and innovation, the development of shared platforms, the development of services for business development, human resources planning and adaptation skills training, the monitoring and foresight and influence of international competitiveness.

Since its inception in 2006, Cap Digital has received more than 1,000 projects, 450 of them were accredited and 300 were funded. These projects represent a total investment of 600M€, including 250M€ of public funding. In 2009, in the regional industry plan, over 60 companies have benefited from development assistance workshops and more than 40 companies have participated in international missions led by Cap Digital.

Cap Digital is also the organizer, since 2009, of Futur en Seine, festival of life and digital creation.

== Advancity (city and sustainable mobility) ==
Advancity is a project submitted by the Polytechnicum de Marne-la-Vallée (Polytechnic of Marne-la-Vallée). Activities: sustainable development of the city, housing and construction, urban mobility. This cluster should develop regional activities in the field of sustainable urban development: the fight against the greenhouse effect, energy saving.

== Mov'eo ==
Mov'eo is a project submitted by the Institut national de recherche sur les transports et leur sécurité (National Research Institute for Transport and Safety Research, INRETS). Its activities are road safety and the environment. This cluster serves to develop automotive technology and environmentally managing security more effectively, in partnership with the adjacent pole Normandy Motor Valley. It should draw on a vast complex scientific experimentation and test transport systems in the military camp of Satory (Versailles). Its activities are concentrated for many around Satory and around the former new town of Saint-Quentin-en-Yvelines. The Comité interministériel d'aménagement et de développement du territoire (CIACT, Interdepartmental Committee on Planning and Land Development) of 6 March 2006 has approved the merger of the pole with the pole Normandy Motor Valley into a new cluster : MOV'EO.

== Finance Innovation ==
Finance Innovation is one of seven worldwide clusters, on the 71 approved by the CIACT. Founding members: FBF, the Fédération française des sociétés d'assurances (FFSA, French Federation of Insurance Companies), AFG, the Paris Chamber of Commerce, NYSE Euronext, the city of Paris and the Île-de-France region.

The objectives are:

- Make Paris the platform of the European Financial Reporting;
- Promote SME finance and innovation;
- Strengthen the research center and financial innovation;
- Develop in Paris a European center in financial training;
- Increase the role of finance in social innovation.

The Fédération Bancaire Française has already announced that it will fund five research departments in investment banking and markets.

== Cosmetic Valley ==
Cosmetic Valley is a national cluster dedicated to perfumery and cosmetics. It was certified in July 2005 and brings together a dozen big names in luxury around a federation of more than 300 companies.

== ASTech Paris Region ==
ASTech is a cluster created 5 July 2007. It brings together all the major players of the engine, space transportation and executive aviation in Île-de-France. It brings together hundreds of players including a third of SMEs, a third of Major Groups and a third of training and research organizations. 34 research and development projects have emerged, with a budget of € 200 million over 6 years.
