= Institut Sup'Biotech de Paris =

French private engineering school

Coordinates: 48°47′53″N 2°21′28″E

- Motto: The school for experts in biotechnology
- Type: Private
- Established: 2003
- Affiliations: IONIS Education Group, Cancer Campus, Medicen, Biocitech, Concours Advance, UGEI
- President: Vanessa Proux
- Students: 800
- Location: Villejuif, Lyon, France
- Website: www.supbiotech.fr

The Institut SupBiotech de Paris (SupBiotech or ISBP; English: Paris Higher Biotechnology Institute) is a French private engineering school created in 2003, located in Villejuif, near Paris, and in Lyon.

SupBiotech is specialized in the field of biotechnology. The school delivers a 5-year program split in two parts: the first three years correspond to a bachelor's degree in biotechnology and the last three years to a French engineering degree (academically equivalent to a master's degree) in biotechnology.

== History ==
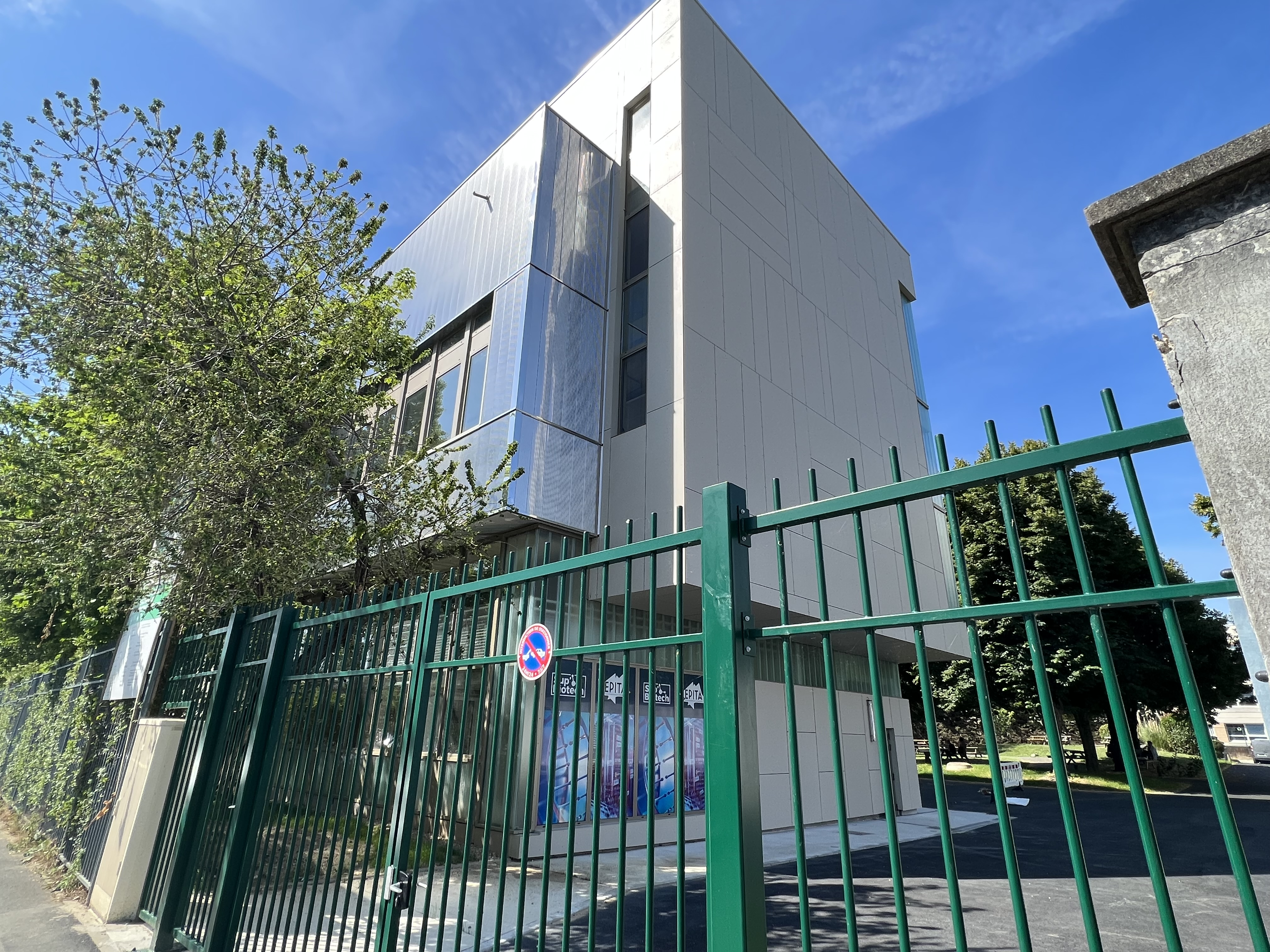
Sup’Biotech Paris campus

SupBiotech was created in 2003 by IONIS Education Group. It provides middle management for biotechnology industries. Biotechnology industries belong mainly to health, innovation food or environment. On 11 January 2012, the degree delivered by the university was recognized level 1 by CNCP. The same year, on 21 February, the university was labeled by the Industries et Agro-Ressources (IAR) cluster. Since 8 January 2015, the university is recognized by the French Ministry of National Education. On 6 December 2016, SupBiotech is recognized by the Commission des Titres d'Ingénieur.

== Administration ==
=== Governance ===
SupBiotech is owned by IONIS Education Group.

=== Director ===
Since the creation of the university, the director has been Vanessa Proux.

List of Sup'Biotech directors
Name	Years
Vanessa Proux	Since 2003

== Teaching and research ==
=== Curriculum ===
==== Bachelor in biotechnology ====
Students begin with the first cycle of three years including a classe préparatoire aux grandes écoles of two years and one year of professionalization with a 3-month internship. During the third year, a trip abroad in a partner university education is compulsory.

==== Master in biotechnology ====
After the first cycle, students begin the second two-year cycle which includes the fourth and fifth year with the choice of a specialization: research / development / production processes or marketing / sales engineer. Students also make the choice of an option: health / medicine, environment, cosmetics, food industry or bioinformatics. During this cycle, two internships (4 and 6 months) are compulsory. SupBiotech signed in January 2011 a partnership with the Cancer Institut Gustave Roussy. The majority of the courses in this cycle are given in English.

In the final year, students who wish can prepare in parallel an MBA at the Institut supérieur de gestion, a Master at IONIS STM, a Master in basic research at several Universities, including the University of Évry Val d'Essonne or at the École pratique des hautes études, or also a double degree with a partnership university abroad. In addition, the school has a partnership with the Ecole Centrale Paris allowing two fifth-year students to follow in parallel a Mastère Spécialisé in biomedical engineering data.

=== International partners ===
SupBiotech has partnerships with universities abroad, including : Tunisia Private University, University of California at San Diego, Université de Montréal, Monterrey Institute of Technology and Higher Education, University of Essex, University of Sussex, Heriot-Watt University in United Kingdom.

=== Research activities ===
SupBiotech has four active research teams, in Bioinformatics (Bio Information Research Laboratory), Cellular Engineering (CellTechs), Agro-environmental Engineering and Sociology.

In May 2012, the university has inaugurated a new bio-production laboratory. It has also a partnership with Pasteur Institute.
