= Taieb Hadhri =

Tunisian politician

Taieb Hadhri (born August 18, 1957) served as the Tunisian Minister of Scientific Research, Technology, and Expertise Development under former president Zine El Abidine Ben Ali.

== Biography ==
Taieb Hadhri was born on August 18, 1957, in Monastir, Tunisia. He received a degree in Engineering from the Ecole Polytechnique in Paris in 1979, and the Ecole Nationale des Ponts et Chaussées in 1981. He also received a PhD in applied mathematics from Pierre and Marie Curie University in 1981, another PhD in 1986. From 1982 to 1986, he was an assistant professor at the University of Technology of Compiègne. From 1984 to 1988, he worked as a researched for the Centre National de la Recherche Scientifique in Paris. From 1988 to 1999, he taught at the Ecole Nationale d'Ingenieurs de Tunis. In 1993, he taught at Rutgers University. In 1995, he became the president of the Ecole Polytechnique de Tunisie.

He served as Minister of Scientific Research, Technology, and Expertise Development under former president Ben Ali from August 2005 to January 2007.
