= Laurène Meyniel-Schicklin =

French bioinformatics engineer

- Born: France
- Education: Master in Bioinformatics, University of Évry Val d'Essonne
- Title: Head of Computational Biology
- Engineering career
- Discipline: Bioinformatics
- Employer: Enyo Pharma

Laurène Meyniel-Schicklin is a bioinformatics engineer who specializes in genomic data science.

== Career ==
In 2014 she co-founded Enyo Pharma where she conducts research on a drug discovery engine which mimics viruses' ability to model the cellular functions of the host. She previously worked as an engineer with Inserm and taught at the Catholic University of Lyon.

== Education ==
She holds a degree in Bioinformatics from the University of Évry Val d'Essonne.

== Awards and honors ==
Laurène was featured in Forbes' Top 50 Women in Tech 2018 list, and she has been granted a patent.
