= Henri Verdier =

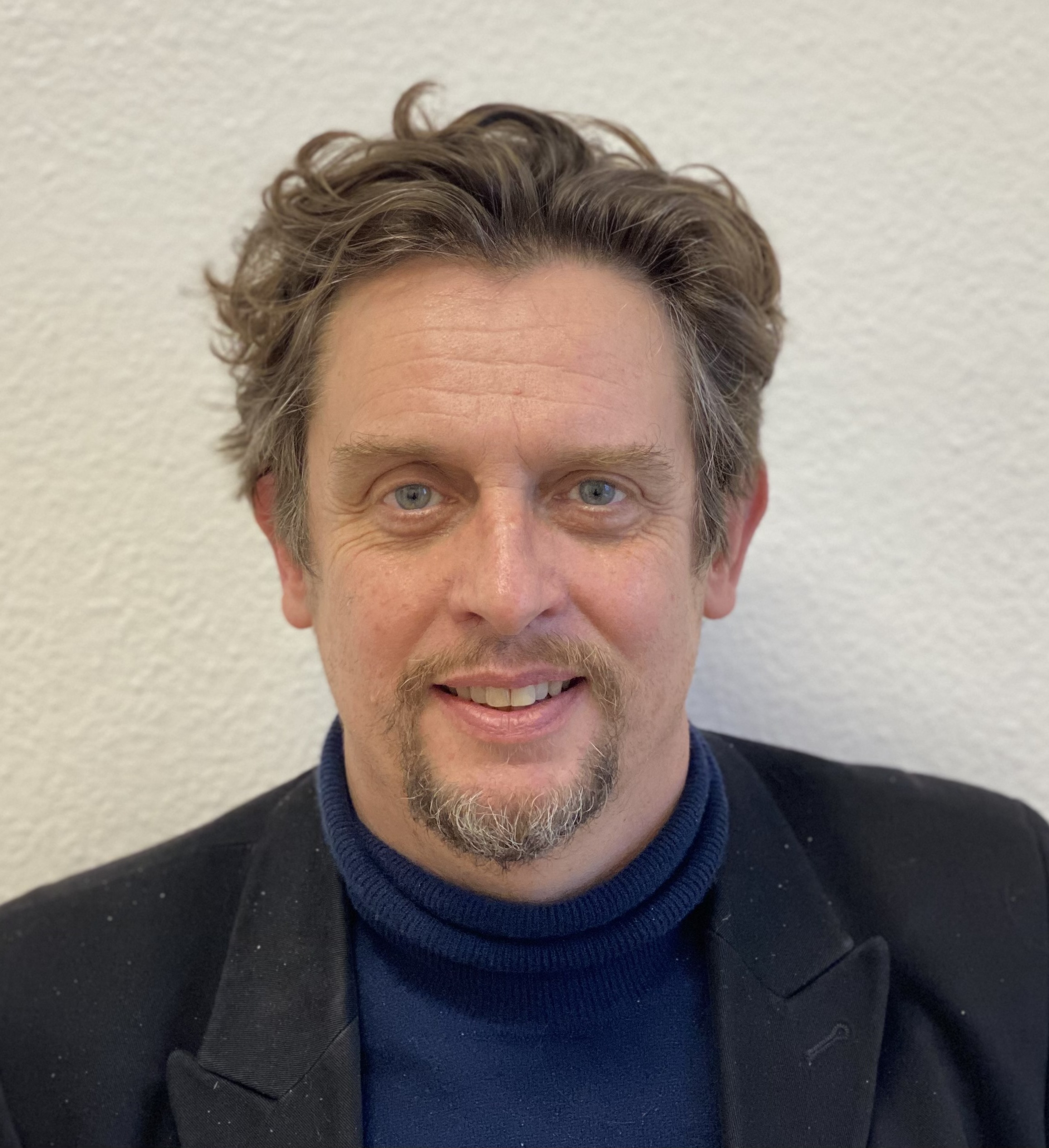
- Henri Verdier in 2021.
- Born: 24 November 1968 (age 57); Toulouse, France
- Education: Ecole Normale Supérieure
- Occupation: French CIO
- Website: Henri Verdier

Henri Verdier (born 1968 in Toulouse) is a French entrepreneur and digital specialist who has been serving as the country's ambassador for digital affairs from 2018 to 2025. Previously he was the French State Chief Technology Officer (CTO) from 2015 to 2018 and, before, the Head of Etalab, the French Agency for Public Open data. He now heads the INRIA Foundation.

== Career ==
=== Career in the private sector ===
Verdier was CEO of MFG Labs, an internet startup involved in social data mining, and Chairman of the Board of Cap Digital, the French European Cluster for Digital Content and Services located in Paris Region. Aside from this position, Verdier was the founding director of "Edition Odile Jacob Multimedia", a publishing company in the field of e-learning, Executive Adviser for Innovation at Lagardère Group and the Director of Prospective for the Institut Telecom.

=== Career in the public sector ===
From January 2013 to September 2015, Verdier headed Etalab, the Prime Minister's office in charge of opening public data. Under his direction, Etalab developed a new version of the French national open data portal "data.gouv.fr", which hosts many public datasets. This version, which allows citizens to enrich public data or share their own data, has been described by the TechPresident blog as a "world first".

By order of Prime Minister Manuel Valls on 16 September 2014, Verdier was appointed as General Data Administrator, akin to the function of the French State’s Chief Data Officer.

At the Council of Ministers of 23 September 2015, Verdier was appointed Chief Digital Officer of France, as head of the DINSIC. The DINSIC (Inter-ministerial Direction for Digital Affairs and the State’s Information and Communication System) combines the functions of an IT department with a digital transformation mission. Continuing the commitment of the Etalab mission to open code, data and algorithms, DINSIC lays the basis of government as a platform (France Connect, api.gouv.fr, National Database addresses) and promotes a strategy within the State for the re-insourcing of resources and the use of agile methods. He is responsible for the implementation in 2015 of the digital services incubator: Beta.gouv.fr, which in three years has created more than 50 "State Startups".

As Director of Mission at Etalab, Verdier actively worked towards France joining the Open Government Partnership (OGP) in 2014. In autumn 2016, as Director of DINSIC, he accompanied and supported France's one-year presidency of the OGP.

As ambassador for digital affairs, Verdier was the French negotiator in charge of preparing the Christchurch Call Summit.

== Works ==
- With Jean-Louis Missika : Le Business de la haine : Internet, la démocratie et les réseaux sociaux (Editions Calmann Lévy, Paris, 2022)
- With Pierre Pezziardi : Des Startup d'Etat à l'Etat plateforme (Fondation pour l'innovation politique, Paris, 2017)
- With Nicolas Colin : L'Age de la multitude, Entreprendre et gouverner après la révolution numérique (Editions Armand Colin, Paris, 2012, 2015)

Numerous contributions in collective works, such as :

- L'Etat en mode Start-Up, Le nouvel âge de l'action publique, (Eyrolles, Paris, mai 2015).
- Numérique et Libertés : un nouvel âge démocratique, Rapport n° 3119, Assemblée nationale, octobre 2015.
- Big, fast & open data. Décrire, décrypter et prédire le monde, FYP Editions, Paris, 2014.
- Le Dictionnaire politique d'Internet et du numérique (Editions La Tribune, Paris, 2010)
- TIC 2025 : Les grandes mutations (FYP Editions, Paris, 2010)
- New Age to New Edge (Orange Institute, San Francisco, 2010)
