= Jean-François Molinari =

French-Swiss engineer and scientist

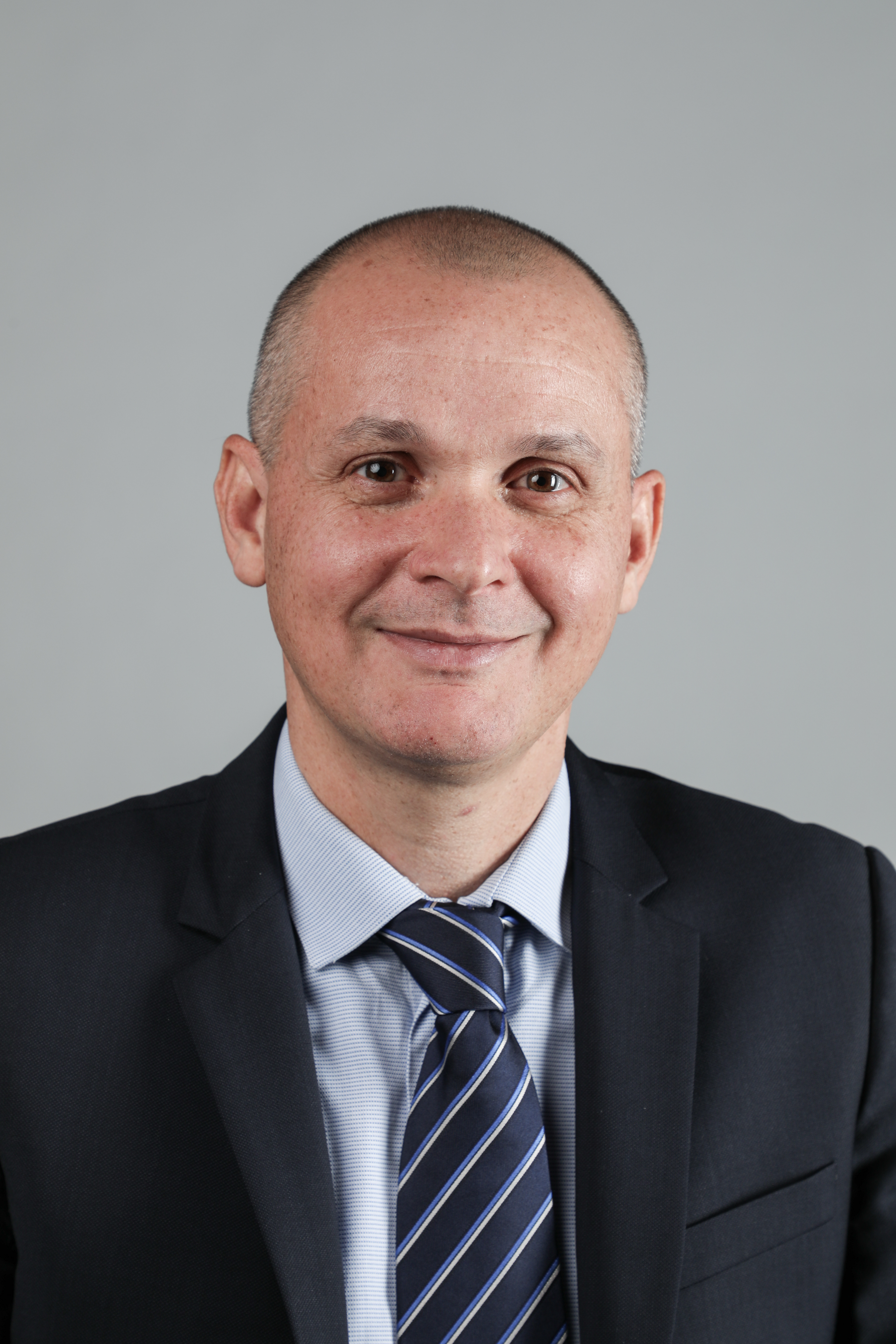
- Jean-François Molinari in 2020
- Born: 1973 (age 52–53); Metz, France
- Education: BS and MS Université de Technologie de Compiègne, France, MS and Ph.D. California Institute of Technology (Caltech), USA
- Known for: Numerical modeling of the mechanics of materials and structures
- Scientific career
- Fields: Mechanics, tribology, numerical modeling
- Workplaces: École Polytechnique Fédérale de Lausanne (EPFL)
- Website: http://lsms.epfl.ch

Jean-François Molinari (born 1973 in Metz, France) is a French-Swiss engineer and scientist specialised in the numerical modeling of the mechanics of materials and structures. He is a full professor and the director of the Computational Solid Mechanics Laboratory at the École Polytechnique Fédérale de Lausanne (EPFL).

== Education and career ==
Molinari received a B.S. and a M.S. in Mechanical Engineering from the University of Technology of Compiègne in 1997. He received a M.S. in 1997 and a Ph.D. in 2001, both in aeronautics, from the California Institute of Technology. From 2000 to 2005, he was assistant professor in Mechanical Engineering at Johns Hopkins University. He was then associate Research Professor from 2006 to 2011 at the same institution. From 2005 to 2007, he was also a professor at École Normale Supérieure Cachan in Mechanics, and held a Teaching Associate position at the École Polytechnique in Paris from 2006 to 2009.

Molinari started his tenure at EPFL in 2007 as associate Professor in structural mechanics in the School of Architecture, Civil and Environmental Engineering., and was promoted to Full Professor in 2012. He is the director of the Computational Solid Mechanics Laboratory at EPFL. He was director of the EPFL Civil Engineering Institute from 2013 to 2017, and has a joint appointment in the Materials Science institute.

Molinari was elected in October 2019 to the Research Council of the Swiss National Science Foundation in Mathematics, Natural and Engineering Sciences. He is the Chair of the Swiss Community for Computational Methods in Applied Sciences, and a member of the European Solid Mechanics Conference Committee (term of 2016-2021).

Molinari is editor in chief for Elsevier's Journal on Mechanics of Materials.

Molinari is a European Mechanics Society Fellow for his "seminal contributions in computational solid mechanics, especially the multiscale modeling of tribological processes".

== Research ==
Molinari and his laboratory's research focuses on developing multi-scale methods to model and analyse damage mechanics of materials and structures as well as their nano- and micro-structural mechanical properties. The laboratory's research is at the interface between Mechanics, Materials Science, and Scientific Computing, with projects in fundamental and applied science and engineering.

Professor Molinari and his collaborators develop physics-based numerical methods for High Performance Computing. Research activities span mechanisms from the small scale (nanostructured materials, tribology) all the way to large length scales (structural mechanics, earthquake science). A central research theme is friction and fracture, and recent breakthrough research seeks to bring a new outlook at traditional engineering wear models.

By modelling the onset of slip between two bodies in frictional contact, Molinari and his collaborators were able to gain insight into the energy balance of earthquakes.

Molinari's laboratory share some of its knowledge by releasing open-source software (molecular dynamics, discrete dislocations, finite elements, boundary element methods, spectral methods, direct multiscale methods).

== Selected publications ==
=== Rough contact mechanics ===
- Hyun, S.; Pei, L.; Molinari, J.-F.; Robbins, M. O. (2004). "Finite-element analysis of contact between elastic self-affine surfaces". Physical Review E. 70 (2) 026117. arXiv:cond-mat/0404237. Bibcode:2004PhRvE..70b6117H. doi:10.1103/PhysRevE.70.026117. PMID 15447555. S2CID 4685930.
- Yastrebov, Vladislav A.; Anciaux, Guillaume; Molinari, Jean-François (2015). "From infinitesimal to full contact between rough surfaces: Evolution of the contact area". International Journal of Solids and Structures. 52: 83–102. arXiv:1401.3800. doi:10.1016/j.ijsolstr.2014.09.019. S2CID 119173879.

=== Adhesive wear processes ===
- Milanese, Enrico; Brink, Tobias; Aghababaei, Ramin; Molinari, Jean-François (2019). "Emergence of self-affine surfaces during adhesive wear". Nature Communications. 10 (1): 1116. Bibcode:2019NatCo..10.1116M. doi:10.1038/s41467-019-09127-8. PMC 6408517. PMID 30850605.
- Aghababaei, Ramin; Warner, Derek H.; Molinari, Jean-François (2017). "On the debris-level origins of adhesive wear". Proceedings of the National Academy of Sciences. 114 (30): 7935–7940. Bibcode:2017PNAS..114.7935A. doi:10.1073/pnas.1700904114. PMC 5544287. PMID 28696291.
- Aghababaei, Ramin; Warner, Derek H.; Molinari, Jean-Francois (2016). "Critical length scale controls adhesive wear mechanisms". Nature Communications. 7 11816. Bibcode:2016NatCo...711816A. doi:10.1038/ncomms11816. PMC 4897754. PMID 27264270.

=== Friction and fracture ===
- Barras, Fabian; Aldam, Michael; Roch, Thibault; Brener, Efim A.; Bouchbinder, Eran; Molinari, Jean-François (2019). "Emergence of Cracklike Behavior of Frictional Rupture: The Origin of Stress Drops". Physical Review X. 9 (4) 041043. arXiv:1906.11533. Bibcode:2019PhRvX...9d1043B. doi:10.1103/PhysRevX.9.041043. S2CID 195700130.
- Barras, Fabian; Aldam, Michael; Roch, Thibault; Brener, Efim A.; Bouchbinder, Eran; Molinari, Jean-François (2020). "The emergence of crack-like behavior of frictional rupture: Edge singularity and energy balance". Earth and Planetary Science Letters. 531 115978. arXiv:1907.04376. Bibcode:2020E&PSL.53115978B. doi:10.1016/j.epsl.2019.115978. S2CID 195874135.
- Kammer, David S.; Radiguet, Mathilde; Ampuero, Jean-Paul; Molinari, Jean-François (2015). "Linear Elastic Fracture Mechanics Predicts the Propagation Distance of Frictional Slip". Tribology Letters. 57 (3). arXiv:1408.4413. doi:10.1007/s11249-014-0451-8. S2CID 19715395.

=== Dynamic Fragmentation ===
- Zhou, Fenghua; Molinari, Jean-François; Ramesh, K. T. (2006). "Effects of material properties on the fragmentation of brittle materials". International Journal of Fracture. 139 (2): 169–196. doi:10.1007/s10704-006-7135-9. S2CID 137280504.
- Levy, S.; Molinari, J.F. (2010). "Dynamic fragmentation of ceramics, signature of defects and scaling of fragment sizes" (PDF). Journal of the Mechanics and Physics of Solids. 58 (1): 12–26. Bibcode:2010JMPSo..58...12L. doi:10.1016/j.jmps.2009.09.002.

=== Scientometrics ===
- Molinari, Jean-Francois; Molinari, Alain (2008). "A new methodology for ranking scientific institutions". Scientometrics. 75: 163–174. doi:10.1007/s11192-007-1853-2. S2CID 562588.
