= Biocitech =

Technology campus in Romainville, France

Coordinates: 48.8939°N 2.4330°E

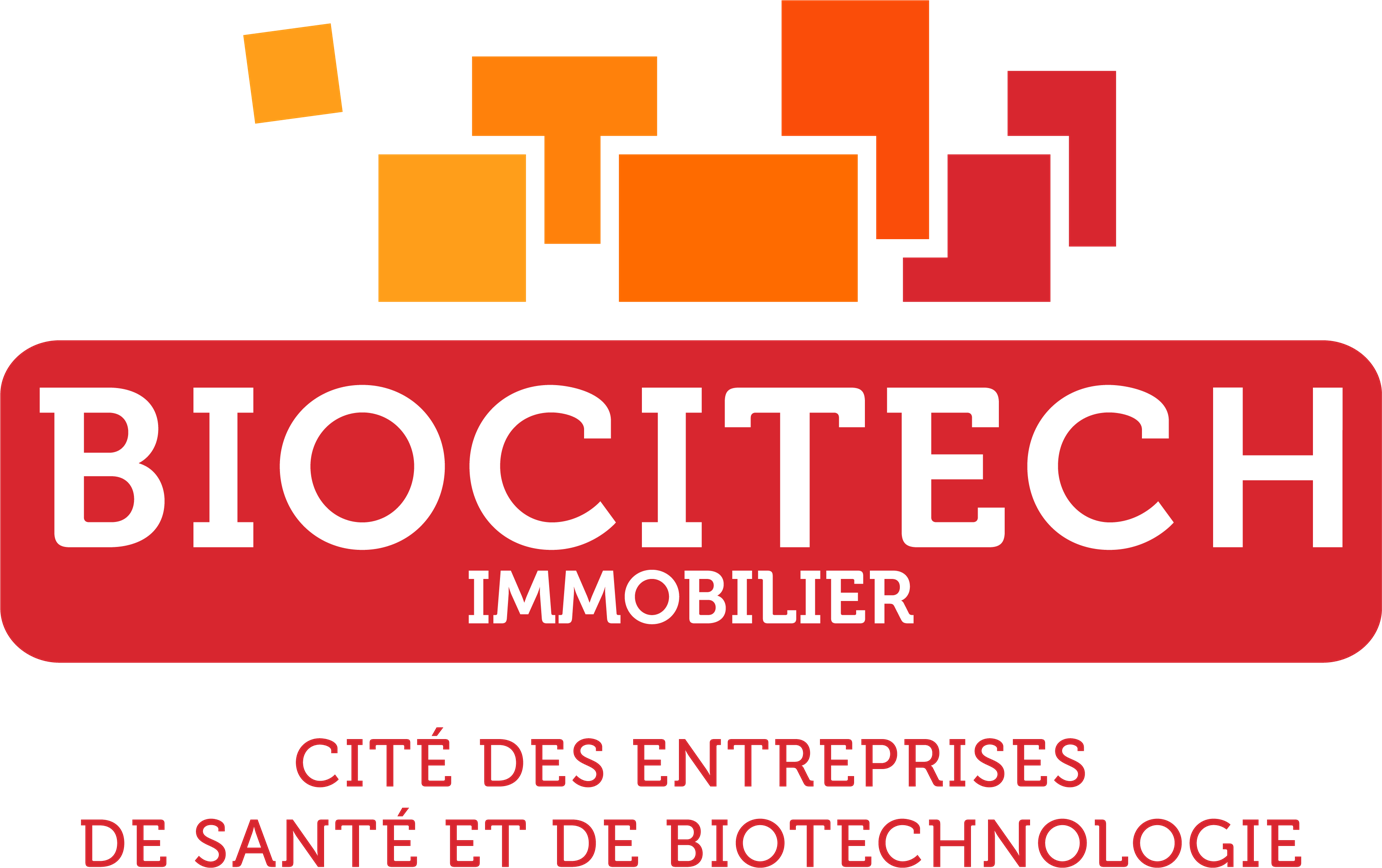
Logo of Biocitech Immobilier

Biocitech Société par actions simplifiée is a technology campus dedicated to biology, which CEO is Jean-François Boussard and located at Romainville, France. Founded in 2002, it welcomes biotechnology, biopharmaceutical and fine chemical companies.

== Partners ==
- Agence Régionale du Développement de Paris-lle-de-France
- Seine-Saint-Denis Avenir
- Medicen Paris Region
- Paris Développement
- Centrale Santé
- Bio critt
- Info Veille Biotech
- Comité Adebiotech
- Institut Sup'Biotech de Paris
