= Caboche =

Caboche is a French surname, which means "head" or "cabbage". Notable people with the surname include:

- Michel Caboche (1946–2021), French plant physiologist
- Simon Caboche (fl. early 15th cent.), French rebel

== See also ==
- Cabossed, term from heraldry
