= The Sorbonne Doctoral College =

The Sorbonne Doctoral College is the doctoral college of the Sorbonne University. It consists University of Paris VI (Pierre and Marie Curie) and University of Paris IV. The two previous universities are direct inheritors of the Sorbonne (divided into 13 autonomous universities after the French riots in 1968). The aim of the "doctoral policy" is to ensure that research conditions offered at the university are of the highest quality to enable students to maximise their time.

The doctorate degree diploma being awarded by two universities (i.e.University of Paris VI and University of Paris IV) jointly since 2010.

== See also ==
- Sorbonne University (alliance)
