= Cancer Campus =

French oncology research campus

Cancer Campus is a research and innovative campus in oncology located in Villejuif, close to Paris, and launched in April 2006. It is devoted to help to fight cancer.

It is backed by the expertise of the Institut Gustave Roussy and other health institutions and research of the Ile-de-France region.

The goal is to bring together on a single research campus (clinical and academic, public and private) companies, high-level training, a set of partners forming a "biocluster" part of the cluster Medicen.

Cancer Campus is included in one of the main projects for Paris defined by French government. Proposed new public transport systems planned to create a metro station on the campus.

Objectives of Cancer Campus are:

- Develop the site of the Institut Gustave Roussy and the surrounding area on a surface of one hundred hectares;
- Constitute a real estate research and higher education, an industrial and services for patients, employees, businesses;
- Create a "citizen space", which analyzes trends and the way society looks at the practices of care and support for patients and makes concrete proposals and partnership to encourage developments in this field, all consistent with the recommendations of the "Cancer Plan".

Cancer campus is managed by a voluntary association which members are:

- The Institut Gustave Roussy and the Assistance Publique – Hôpitaux de Paris;
- The departement of Val-de-Marne, Villejuif city;
- The Paris Chamber of Commerce;
- The Institut Sup'Biotech de Paris.

The Caisse des dépôts et consignations is also a partnership, as well as Ile-de-France region, and the business cluster of Medicen.
