= Lamia Chafei Seghaier =

Tunisian engineer and politician

- Born: May 4, 1968; Tunis
- Occupation(s): Engineer and Politician

Lamia Chafei Seghaier (born 4 May 1968 in Tunis) is a Tunisian engineer and politician. She was the Secretary of State to the Minister of Communication Technologies in charge of Information Technology, Internet and Free Software between 2008 and 2011.

== Education ==
Seghaier earned a master's degree in electrical engineering from National Engineering School of Monastir and University of Technology of Compiègne.

== Career ==
In 1993, Seghaier became a network engineer in a private company, and then in 1996 she began working at the Tunisian Internet Agency, where she was successively Head of Service in charge of e-commerce, Deputy Director in charge of Technology and Security, and then Director in charge of Technology.

Seghaier became CEO, replacing Adel Gaaloul, and held this position from September 2007 to 2 January 2008.

Seghaier also helped develop some university courses, from 2000 to 2002,.

Between January 2008 and January 2011, Seghaier was Secretary of State to the Minister of Communication Technologies in charge of Information Technology, Internet and Free Software. She held this position in the first Ghannouchi government, and then with Minister Mohamed Naceur Ammar, from 2010 and until the 2011 revolution.

== Personal life ==
Seghaier is married and has one child.
