= Vanessa Proux =

French biologist

- Born: Vanessa Proux; 31 May 1974 (age 51)
- Education: Doctorate in enzyme engineering, microbiology and bioconversion
- Alma mater: University of Technology of Compiègne
- Occupation: President of Institut Sup'Biotech de Paris
- Years active: Since 2004
- Employer: IONIS Education Group
- Known for: President of Institut Sup'Biotech de Paris
- Website: https://www.supbiotech.fr/ecole-ingenieurs-biotechnologies/equipe/

Vanessa Proux (born 31 May 1974) is a French biologist and the current President of Institut Sup'Biotech de Paris.

Holder of a Master's degree in biochemistry (1997) and another one in enzyme engineering, microbiology and bioconversion, Vanessa Proux graduated from University of Technology of Compiègne in October 2001 (Doctorate in enzyme engineering, microbiology and bioconversion). From 2001 to 2003, she was research engineer at the biological department of the Commissariat à l'énergie atomique. At the end of 2003, she was hired by the Institute of biochemistry, molecular biophysics and cells of the Paris-Sud 11 University. In parallel, she teaches chemistry and enzymology at the UTC and Sup'Biotech.

Since February 2004, she is the President of the Institut Sup'Biotech de Paris.

== Bibliography ==
- Biotechnologies. Les promesses du vivant., Villejuif, FYP Éditions, 2015, 256 p. (ISBN 978-2-36405-132-4)
- Planète biotech - 2030 : la vie avec les biotechnologies, Villejuif, FYP Éditions, 2023, 254 p. (ISBN 978-2-36405-227-7)
