= Science and technology in France =

Science and technology in France has a long history dating back to the Académie des Sciences, founded by Louis XIV in 1666, at the suggestion of Jean-Baptiste Colbert, to encourage and protect the spirit of French scientific research. France's achievements in science and technology have been significant throughout the past centuries as France's economic growth and industrialisation process was slow and steady along the 18th and 19th centuries. Research and development efforts form an integral part of the country's economy.

Scientific research in the country is supported by industry, by the network of French universities and by higher education establishments outside the main framework, Grandes écoles.

France ranked 13th in the 2025 Global Innovation Index, and remained in the same position in the 2026 index.

== Historical overview ==
The tradition of scientific research in France can be traced back to the Scientific Revolution. France is home to some of the world's oldest universities (Montpellier, Paris) although they were, at the time of their foundation, more centered on philosophy, theology and law than on science.

== Institutions ==
=== French écoles normales supérieures ===
- École Normale Supérieure
- École normale supérieure Paris-Saclay
- École Normale Supérieure de Lyon

== Scientific fields ==
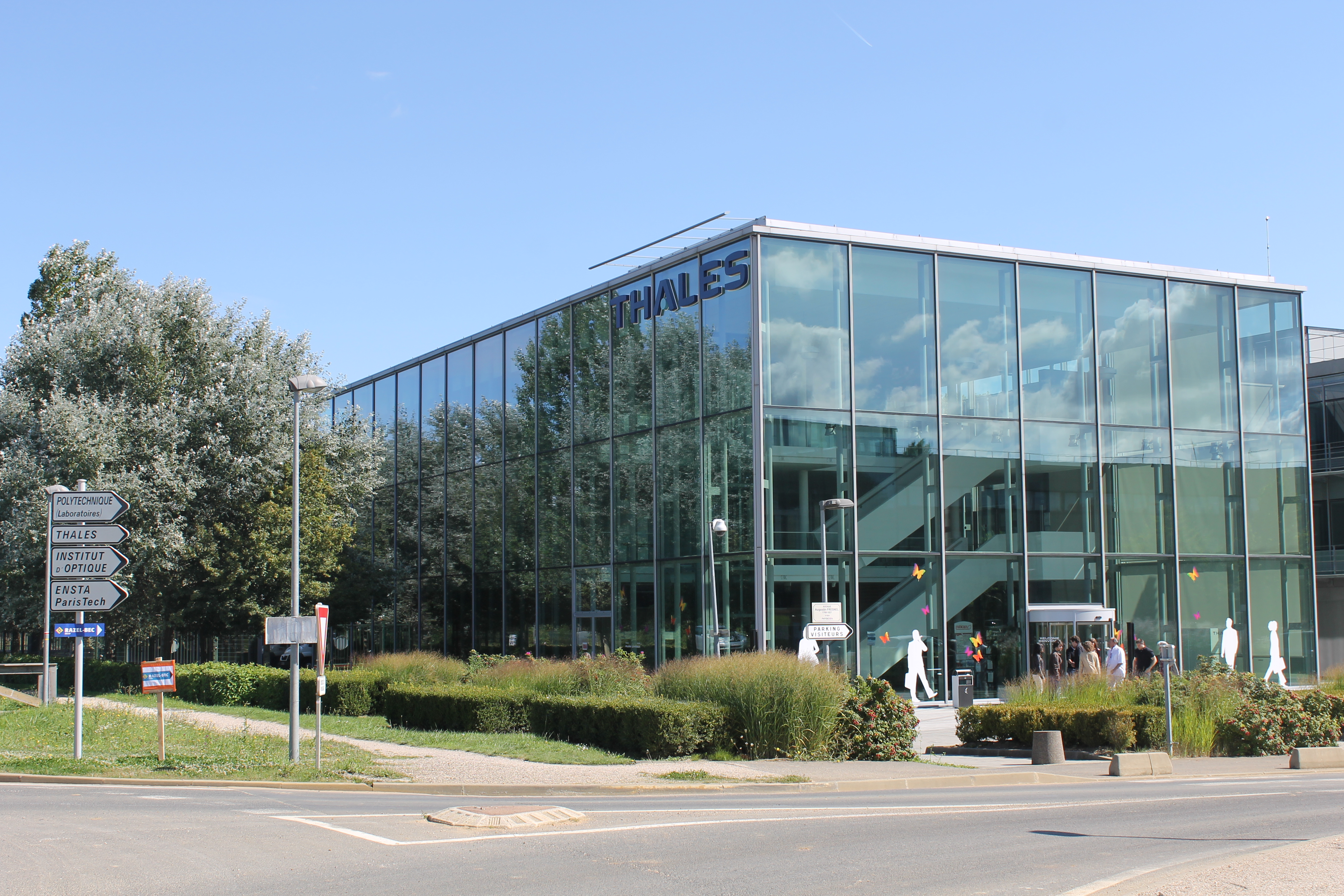
The research centre of Thales Group in the business cluster of Paris-Saclay, France

=== Physics ===
Radioactivity was discovered by Henri Becquerel in 1896. The theoretical foundations and mathematical framework of special relativity were laid by Henri Poincaré, before Albert Einstein used them in 1905 and later.

=== Chemistry ===
The conservation of mass law was discovered by Antoine Lavoisier in 18th century France.

=== Mathematics ===
The Cartesian Coordinate System was discovered by René Descartes in 1637 (and independently by Pierre de Fermat at the same period). The first calculator by Blaise Pascal (Pascaline) was made in 1642. (see also Adding machine) Probability theory was developed by Pierre de Fermat and Blaise Pascal in the seventeenth century (with Gerolamo Cardano and Christiaan Huygens).

France is home to 11 Fields Medalists, second only to the United States in number of Fields Medalists. The fictitious mathematician Nicolas Bourbaki's "association of collaborators" is based at École Normale Supérieure in France.

=== Nuclear power ===
France carried out its first test of an atomic bomb in Algeria in 1960 and some operational French nuclear weapons became available in 1964. Then, France executed its first test of the much more powerful hydrogen bomb over its South Pacific Ocean test range in 1968; this first hydrogen bomb was dropped from a strategic bomber. France was the fourth de facto nuclear power after United States, Soviet Union and United Kingdom.

=== Space science ===
In 1961 CNES was established. In 1965, France was the third nation, after the former USSR and the United States, to launch its own space satellite. The French no longer launch their own satellites, however, preferring instead to contribute to the European Space Agency.

== See also ==
- List of French scientists
- Open access in France
