= Cécile Réal =

French biomedical engineer and business executive

Cécile Réal (French pronunciation: [sesil ʁeal]; born 29 November 1973) is a French biomedical engineer and business executive. In 2012, as president of Endodiag, she won the Cartier Women's Initiative Award for developing tools to diagnose and treat endometriosis.

== Biography ==
Réal, who studied biomechanical engineering at the University of Technology of Compiègne (1991–1996) also has a master's degree in business and technology management from Lappeenranta University of Technology in Finland. In 1999, when she was only 25, she founded and ran Bioprofile which produced orthopaedic implants with pyrocarbon. She sold the company in 2007, deeming it important to allow more experienced players to bring the products to market. While serving as chief operating officer at Ariana Pharma (2008–2010), a company specializing in biomarkers, in 2009 she founded Fluoptics which handles fluorescence imaging for cancer surgery. In 2011, she co-founded Endodiag where she is CEO.

Endodiag specializes in endometriosis which occurs when small pieces of the lining of the womb migrate to other parts of the body. The cells cause pain and can lead to infertility. It is not unusual for diagnosis to take up to nine years. The company is developing methods to improve diagnosis with tools such as EndoGram, based on biopsy, and EndoDiag, relying on a simple blood test.

In 2016, Réal was the speaker for a TEDx Talk on "Endometriosis-The Mystery Disease of Women."
