= Sorbonne University Alliance =

Association of academic institutions in Paris, France

Alliance Sorbonne Université
- Type: Public; EPSCP
- Established: 2010
- President: Thierry Tuot
- Faculty: 7,700 (2,900 tenured professors)
- Students: 57,800
- Undergraduates: 23,000
- Postgraduates: 23,000
- Location: Paris, France
- Campus: Urban
- Website: sorbonne-universite.fr

Sorbonne University Alliance (French: Alliance Sorbonne Université) is a group of ten academic institutions associated with Sorbonne University. After the fusion between Paris-Sorbonne University and Pierre and Marie Curie University under the name Sorbonne University (French: Sorbonne Université) in 2018, the university system Sorbonne Universités changed its name to Association Sorbonne Université and later to Alliance Sorbonne Université.

The original group was founded in June 2010 by: Panthéon-Assas University, Paris-Sorbonne University, and Pierre-and-Marie-Curie University. The latter two merged in 2018 into Sorbonne University and Panthéon-Assas is now an associate member. Other members include INSEAD, the University of Technology of Compiègne, the National Museum of Natural History, and research centers such as the French National Centre for Scientific Research, the French Institute of Health and Medical Research, the French Institute for Research in Computer Science and Automation, and the French Research Institute for Development.

The group comprises nearly 60,000 students annually, of which 5,000 are Ph.D. students.

Members of the group have set up many projects to strengthen relations between them and to create new academic courses and research programs in the fields of science, medicine, law, human and social science, engineering, business management, and arts.

Member institutions are associated with twenty Nobel laureates and seven Field Medalists, ten billionaires, and three heads of state.

The group has been granted €130 million by the French government. Its budget was €680 million as of 2012.

== History ==
The group was founded in June 2010 by, at that time, some of the successors of the University of Paris: Panthéon-Assas University (now an associate member), Paris-Sorbonne University, and Pierre-and-Marie-Curie University. The University of Paris, also known simply as the Sorbonne, is the medieval university of Paris that was divided into 13 autonomous universities after the French riots in 1968.

In the early 2000s, to perform on the international scale, these thirteen universities joined forces with public research and higher-education institutions and grandes écoles. In 2006, a French law compelled every university institution to join a university group. This was aimed at forming big university and research clusters able to compete with the best international universities.

In 2010, Sorbonne University formed its first group. Since then, other university institutions have joined, such as the National Museum of Natural History. Panthéon-Assas University left the group in 2013 because it was not happy with the governance of the group and became an associate member in 2014. As of 2015, Sorbonne University was composed of 11 founding members and 11 other associate members.

Like other French university groups, this group is a first step toward a merger of the relevant universities. Paris-Sorbonne University (one of the inheritors of the faculty of humanities of the University of Paris) and Pierre and Marie Curie University (an inheritor of the faculties of science and medicine) merged in 2018 as Sorbonne University. Panthéon-Assas University (one of the heirs of the faculty of law and economics) and University of Technology of Compiègne may merge with it in the years to come.

== Organization ==
=== Founding members ===
As of 1 January 2018

- Sorbonne University
- University of Technology of Compiègne
- INSEAD
- National Museum of Natural History
- Pôle Supérieur d'Enseignement Paris Boulogne-Billancourt
- Centre international d'études pédagogiques
- French National Centre for Scientific Research
- French Institute of Health and Medical Research
- French Institute for Research in Computer Science and Automation
- French Institute of Research for the Development

=== Associate members ===
As of 1 January 2018

- Panthéon-Assas University (Paris 2) (starting as founding member)
- Archives nationales
- Paris Notarial Institute
- Centre des monuments nationaux
- École de formation professionnelle des barreaux de la cour d'appel de Paris
- École Nationale des Chartes
- French National School for the Judiciary
- École Navale
- École des officiers de la gendarmerie nationale
- Camp Coëtquidan
- École nationale supérieure de la Police
- National Institute for Art History

== Campus ==
=== Parisian campuses ===
The main campus of Sorbonne University is the historic central Sorbonne building in the Latin quarter, which Paris-Sorbonne University (Paris 4) shares with other universities not included in Sorbonne University. Sorbonne University is also located in the Jussieu Campus, near the Latin quarter. The campus is occupied by Pierre and Marie Curie University (Paris 6). After a long period of restoration, the first half of the new campus was inaugurated in September 2014 with new academic buildings, new dormitories, and a gymnasium.

In Paris, Sorbonne University has the campuses of Sorbonne, Jussieu, Pitié-Salpêtrière, Cordeliers, Saint-Antoine, Trousseau, Tenon, the Paris Institute of Astrophysics, the Vision Institute belonging to the Pierre and Marie Curie University; the Jardin des plantes, the Institut de Paléontologie humaine, the Musée de l'Homme, the Paris Zoological Park, properties of the National museum of natural history; the Latin quarter campus, the Centre Clignancourt, the Maison de la recherche, the Institut national d'histoire de l'art, the Institut d'art et d'archéologie, the Malesherbes University center, and the Institut d'urbanisme et d'aménagement, all belonging to the Paris-Sorbonne University; the École supérieure d'art dramatique de Paris, the Conservatoire à rayonnement régional de Paris, all belonging to the Pôle Supérieur Paris Boulogne-Billancourt

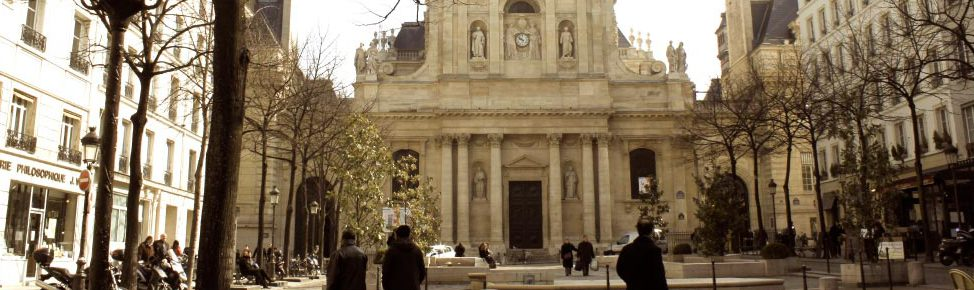
The Sorbonne

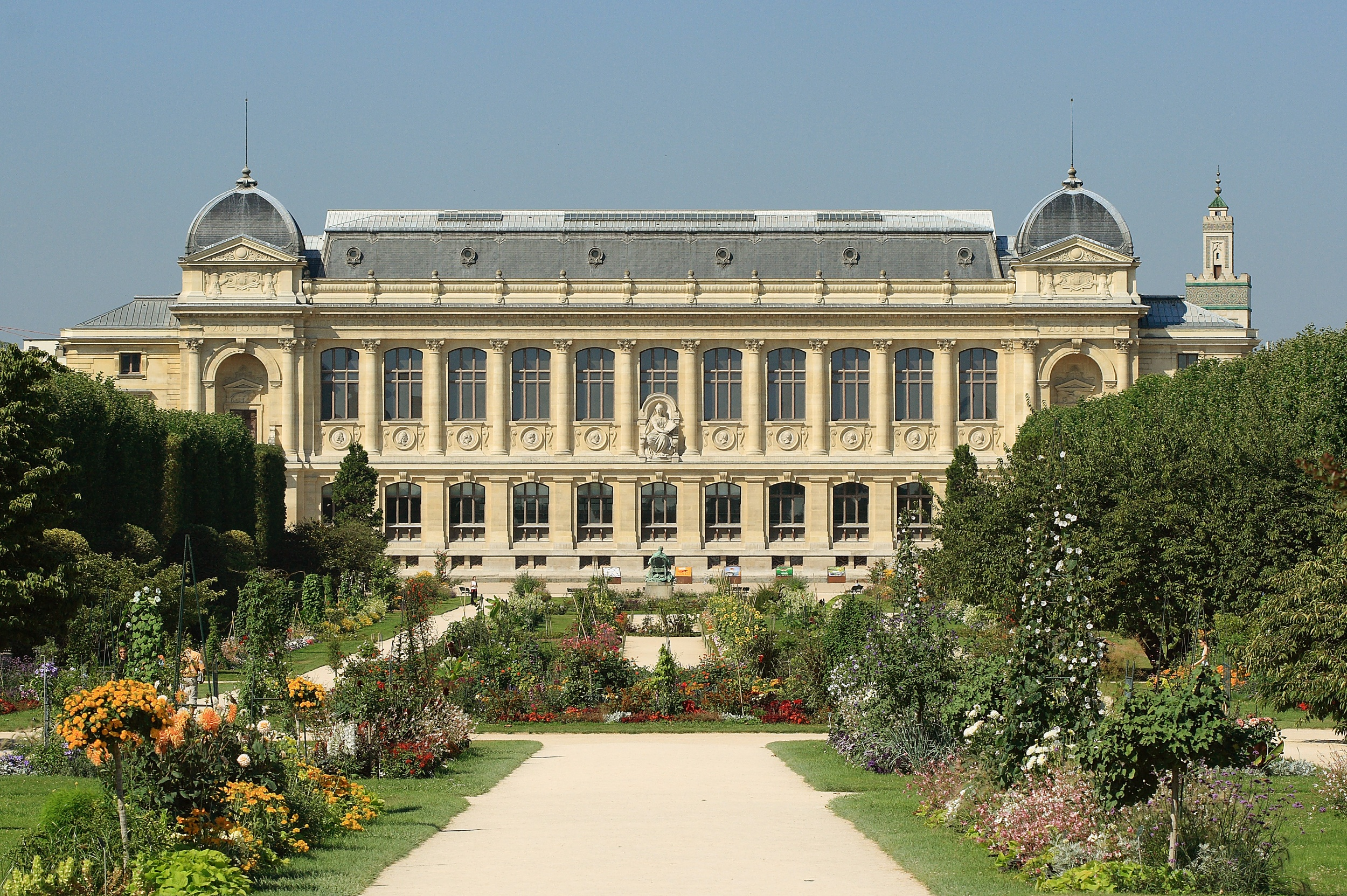
Perspective view from the Jardin des Plantes

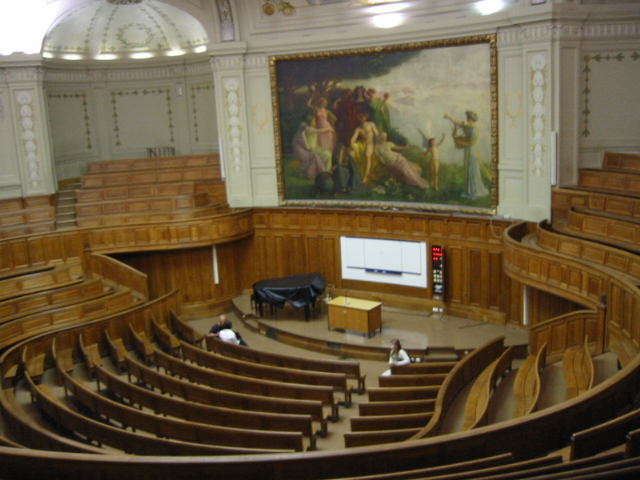
The "Amphithéâtre Richelieu", a Paris-Sorbonne University lecture hall

=== Paris region campuses ===
Location of Sorbonne University establishments - Paris region

Sorbonne University is also located in other numerous places in the Paris region:

- In Bondy, with the Institute of Research for Development campus, opened in 2013
- In Boulogne-Billancourt, with the Pôle Supérieur d'Enseignement Paris Boulogne-Billancourt
- In Brunoy, with the Center of General Ecology of the National Museum of Natural History
- In Dammarie-les-Lys, with the Didier Lockwood Musical Center, belonging to the Pôle Supérieur d'Enseignement Paris Boulogne-Billancourt
- In Fontainebleau, with the INSEAD campus
- In Ivry-sur-Seine, with the Longevity Institute of the Charles-Foix Hospital, belonging to Pierre and Marie Curie University
- In Menton, with the Jardin botanique du Val Rahmeh, property of the National Museum of Natural History
- In Neuilly-sur-Seine, with Celsa, part of Paris-Sorbonne University
- In Obterre, with the Haute Touche Zoological Park, property of the National Museum of Natural History
- In Rocquencourt, with the Arboretum de Chèvreloup, property of the National Museum of Natural History
- In Saint-Cyr-l'École, with the Jean-Le-Rond-d'Alembert Institute, part of Pierre and Marie Curie University

=== National campuses ===
Location of Sorbonne University establishments - Paris area excluded

Sorbonne University is also located in numerous other places in France:

- In Banyuls-sur-Mer, with the Observatoire océanologique, belonging to Pierre and Marie Curie University
- In Concarneau, with the Concarneau Biological Station, belonging to the National Museum of Natural History
- In Compiègne, with the main campus of the University of Technology of Compiègne
- In Dinard, with the Centre de recherche et d'enseignement sur les systèmes côtiers, belonging to the National Museum of Natural History
- In Eyzies-de-Tayac-Sireuil, with the prehistoric site called Abri Pataud, property of the National Museum of Natural History
- In Roscoff, with the Station biologique de Roscoff, belonging to Pierre and Marie Curie University
- In Saint-Cyr-l'École, with the Jean-Le-Rond-d'Alembert Institute, part of Pierre and Marie Curie University
- In Samoëns, with the Jaÿsinia Botanical Garden, property of the National Museum of Natural History
- In Sérignan-du-Comtat, with the Harmas de Fabre museum, property of the National Museum of Natural History
- In Villefranche-sur-Mer, with the Villefranche-sur-Mer Marine Station, belonging to Pierre and Marie Curie University

=== International establishment ===
Location of Sorbonne University's international establishments

Thanks to its members, Sorbonne University can benefit from a wide range of international partnerships, both in Europe and worldwide. These partnerships allow academic mobility for students and a broader scientific cooperation for researchers. For example, Sorbonne University is also established in Asia, with one campus in Singapore, residence of INSEAD, and two campuses in Abu Dhabi, both for INSEAD and the Paris-Sorbonne University Abu Dhabi.

Sorbonne University has also formed its own academic partnerships: in Canada; Brazil; Mexico, with UNAM; in China with the Harbin Institute of Technology; and in Singapore, with Nanyang Technological University and the Yale-NUS College.

== Academic ==
Members of the group have worked on several projects in order to strengthen relations and potentially create a new international institution. The most famous projects are the Sorbonne College (Collège de la Sorbonne) for bachelor's degree teaching and the Sorbonne Doctoral College (Collège doctoral de la Sorbonne) for PhD candidates.

=== Sorbonne College ===
Since 2014, the Sorbonne College for bachelor's degree (« Collège des Licences de la Sorbonne ») has been coordinating academic projects of the members of the group. It also offers cross-institutional academic courses in many fields, allowing students to graduate from both institutions. For example, some cross-institutional bachelor's degrees (« double licences ») are proposed to students between Paris-Sorbonne University, Pierre-et-Marie-Curie University, and Panthéon-Assas University, in:

- Science and History (UPMC / Paris-Sorbonne)
- Science and Musicology (UPMC / Paris-Sorbonne)
- Science and Philosophy (UPMC / Paris-Sorbonne)
- Science and Chinese (UPMC / Paris-Sorbonne)
- Science and German (UPMC / Paris-Sorbonne)
- Law and History (Panthéon-Assas / Paris-Sorbonne)
- Law and Art History (Panthéon-Assas / Paris-Sorbonne)
- Law and Science (Panthéon-Assas / UPMC)
- History and Media (Paris-Sorbonne / Panthéon-Assas)

As is the case in the Anglo-American university systems, Sorbonne University proposes a major-minor program that is currently being deployed at Pierre and Marie Curie University.

Sorbonne University, in partnership with INSEAD, also offers all of its alumni and PhD students a professionalizing course in business management, to complete their curriculum.

=== Doctoral College ===
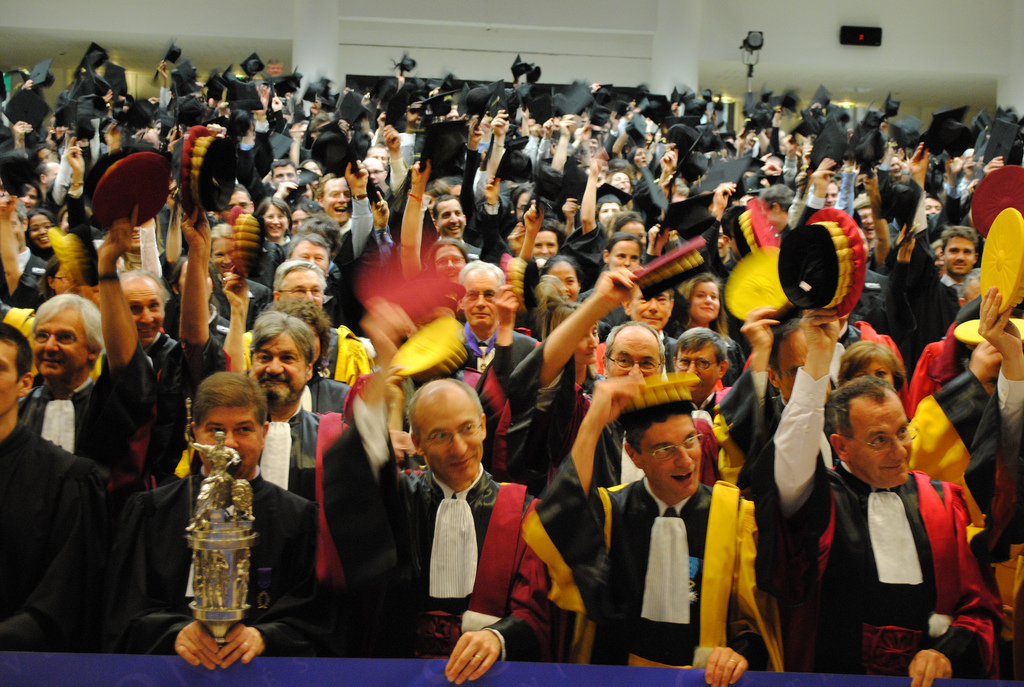
Sorbonne University's graduation ceremony, May 2011

Since 2010, every PhD student is granted an honorary diploma labeled "Sorbonne University". This diploma highlights and gathers the skills of doctors and researchers from the institutions that form Sorbonne University.

The Sorbonne Doctoral College, created in 2013, coordinates the activities of the 26 doctoral schools. Since 2014, it has developed cross-disciplinary PhDs between the different members of the group:

Sorbonne University's doctoral schools
| Fields | Doctoral school | Institution |
|---|---|---|
| Énergie, matière, univers | Chimie physique & chimie analytique de Paris centre | Pierre and Marie Curie University (Paris 6) |
| Énergie, matière, univers | Physique et chimie des matériaux | Pierre and Marie Curie University (Paris 6) |
| Énergie, matière, univers | Chimie moléculaire de Paris centre | Pierre and Marie Curie University (Paris 6) |
| Énergie, matière, univers | Astronomie et astrophysique | Pierre and Marie Curie University (Paris 6) |
| Énergie, matière, univers | Sciences de la Terre et physique de l'univers | Pierre and Marie Curie University (Paris 6) |
| Énergie, matière, univers | Physique en Ile-de-France | Pierre and Marie Curie University (Paris 6) |
| Modélisation et ingénierie | Informatique, télécommunications & électronique | Pierre and Marie Curie University (Paris 6) |
| Modélisation et ingénierie | Sciences mathématiques de Paris centre | Pierre and Marie Curie University (Paris 6) |
| Modélisation et ingénierie | Sciences mécaniques, acoustique, électronique et robotique | Pierre and Marie Curie University (Paris 6) |
| Modélisation et ingénierie | Sciences pour l'ingénieur | University of Technology of Compiègne |
| Terre vivante et environnement | Sciences de l'environnement | Pierre and Marie Curie University (Paris 6) |
| Terre vivante et environnement | Géosciences, ressources naturelles et environnement | Pierre and Marie Curie University (Paris 6) |
| Terre vivante et environnement | Sciences de la Nature et de l'Homme : évolution et écologie | National Museum of Natural History |
| Vie et santé | Cerveau, cognition, comportement | Pierre and Marie Curie University (Paris 6) |
| Vie et santé | Santé publique & sciences de l’information biomédicale | Pierre and Marie Curie University (Paris 6) |
| Vie et santé | Physiologie, physiopathologie et thérapeutique | Pierre and Marie Curie University (Paris 6) |
| Vie et santé | Complexité du vivant | Pierre and Marie Curie University (Paris 6) |
| Histoire-Géographie | École doctorale de géographie de Paris | Paris-Sorbonne University (Paris 4) |
| Histoire-Géographie | Histoire de l’art et archéologie Paris-Sorbonne | Paris-Sorbonne University (Paris 4) |
| Histoire-Géographie | Histoire moderne et contemporaine | Paris-Sorbonne University (Paris 4) |
| Histoire-Géographie | Mondes anciens et médiévaux | Paris-Sorbonne University (Paris 4) |
| Langues, lettres et civilisations | Littératures françaises et comparée | Paris-Sorbonne University (Paris 4) |
| Langues, lettres et civilisations | Civilisations, cultures et sociétés | Paris-Sorbonne University (Paris 4) |
| Langues, lettres et civilisations | Concepts et Language | Paris-Sorbonne University (Paris 4) |
| Management | INSEAD PhD program in management | INSEAD |

Since 2011, Sorbonne University has celebrated its graduates in a formal ceremony where every PhD graduate wears a scholar's uniform.

=== Research ===
To strengthen the influence of its research infrastructures on the international scale, Sorbonne University has developed several research programs aimed at reinforcing or exploring new fields of study. This innovative cross-disciplinary approach was embodied with the creation of four new academic positions, gathering several establishments of the group:

- A Department of Digital Humanities, exploring the use of digital technologies in the social sciences
- A Department of Polychromatic Studies of Societies, associating architecture, anthropology, chemical physics, literature, and art history
- A Department of Digital Health, exploring biomedical tools
- A Department of 3D Craniofacial Reconstruction

Sorbonne University has also formed, with academic institutions such as the China Scholarship Council or the Brazilian foundation FAPERJ, several partnerships enabling bilateral research programs.

== Academic results ==
Academic rankings

Global
- ARWU: 35 (PMCU)
- THE: 103 (PMCU)

Some of Sorbonne University’ members have recently won fame in global and national university rankings.

=== Global university rankings ===
The Academic Ranking of World Universities for 2014-2015 ranks PMCU 35th in the world; 1st French university and 6th university in Europe. In the same edition of the ranking, PMCU is the 4th university for mathematics.

In 2014, Pierre-and-Marie-Curie University was ranked 103rd in the world, 3rd in France, and 29th in the world for physics in the Times Higher Education World University Rankings, while Paris-Sorbonne University is ranked 56th in the world for reputation, 2nd in France.

QS World University Rankings 2015 (world's top 800 universities) ranks Paris-Sorbonne University 1st in France, 36th in the world for arts and humanities (9th for modern languages, 30th for philosophy).

The Financial Times ranked INSEAD #1 in the world in its Global MBA Rankings in 2016, 2017, 2021.

=== National university ranking ===
The main universities and institutions of this group are considered as the first or one of the first universities in their field.

== Student life ==
Since 2010, Sorbonne University has set a goal of optimizing students' living conditions and pooling associative activities of all the students.

=== Associations ===
Sorbonne University offers financial support to associations or student initiatives that help gather the students of each institution that comprises the group. Among the associations that are currently supported, are:

- The association Doc’Up, founded in 2006, a students’ union that unites PhD students of every member of the group. The association aims at defending PhD students’ rights within the academic representative assemblies and helping them add value to their curriculum. Since 2007, the association has been organizing a scientific popularization short-film festival called « Les chercheurs font leur cinéma » (« Researchers create cinema »).
- In 2014, the music festival Imaginarium was founded by students of the UTC

Sorbonne University also supports students' welcoming initiatives at the beginning of the fall term, such as :

- Les Sorbonnales, a cross-institutional student ball that gathers every student of Sorbonne University. The sixth edition of the ball took place in 2014
- Since 2012, a welcome week has been organized at Pierre and Marie Curie University

=== Culture ===
Since 2012, Sorbonne University has organized an eloquence contest called « Fleurs d’Éloquence », during which every Sorbonne University student can compete. 150 students participated in 2015.

Sorbonne University has its own musical ensemble, called Chœur-Orchestre Sorbonne-Universités (Sorbonne University Choir & Orchestra). COSU gathers 250 students, instrumentalists, and vocalists, who perform throughout the school year in concert halls, such as Sorbonne's Grand Amphitheater, or in other parts of Europe.

=== Sports ===
Each member of Sorbonne University provides its own range of sporting activities. Nevertheless, the members have recently begun to consolidate their sports facilities following the renovation of the Jussieu Campus: the new Jean-Talbot gymnasium was opened in the fall of 2014, and has since then become the venue for indoor sports.

Sorbonne University also takes part in student sport competitions, where it competes with other establishments. In 2014, Sorbonne University won 3rd place in the World Championships of Grandes Écoles and Universities, a competition jointly organized by the French Athletics Federation and the Journal of Grandes Écoles and Universities, a French magazine for students.

== Notable people ==
=== Science ===
Faculty Nobel Prizes
| Member | Area | Year |
|---|---|---|
| Philippe Aghion | Economics | 2025 |
| Anne L'Huillier | Physics | 2023 |
| Emanuelle Charpentier | Chemistry | 2020 |
| Gérard Mourou | Physics | 2018 |
| Serge Haroche | Physics | 2012 |
| Françoise Barré-Sinoussi | Physiology or Medicine | 2008 |
| Claude Cohen-Tannoudji | Physics | 1997 |
| Pierre-Gilles de Gennes | Physics | 1991 |
| Maurice Allais | Economic Sciences | 1988 |
| Alfred Kastler | Physics | 1966 |
| François Jacob | Physiology or Medicine | 1965 |
| André Lwoff | Physiology or Medicine | 1965 |
| Jacques Monod | Physiology or Medicine | 1965 |
| Frédéric Joliot | Chemistry | 1935 |
| Irène Joliot-Curie | Chemistry | 1935 |
| Louis de Broglie | Physics | 1929 |
| Jean-Baptiste Perrin | Physics | 1926 |
| Charles Richet | Physiology or Medicine | 1913 |
| Marie Curie | Chemistry | 1911 |
| Gabriel Lippmann | Physics | 1908 |
| Henri Moissan | Chemistry | 1906 |
| Henri Becquerel | Physics | 1903 |
| Marie Curie | Physics | 1903 |

Fourteen Nobel laureates have been faculty members, researchers, or alumni, along with 7 Field Medalists:

- Artur Avila (2014)
- Cédric Villani (2010)
- Wendelin Werner (2006)
- Pierre-Louis Lions (2004)
- Alain Connes (1982)
- René-Frédéric Thom (1958)
- Jean-Pierre Serre (1954)

Sorbonne University has many notable teachers, some of whom have themselves graduated from the members of the group:

- Pierre-and-Marie-Curie University: Alain Carpentier, surgeon and cardiologist, Lasker award; Alain Fuchs, president of CNRS; Serge Haroche, Nobel prize for Physics
- Paris-Sorbonne University: Jean-Luc Marion, philosopher, member of the Académie française; Jean Tulard, historian, member of the Académie des Sciences morales et politiques
- University of Technology of Compiègne: Yann Moulier-Boutang, economist and essayist; Bernard Stiegler, philosopher and member of the French Digital Council

=== Business ===
- Taavet Hinrikus, cofounder and chairman of TransferWise
- Bernard Broermann, founder of Asklepios Kliniken
- Rudolf Maag, founder of Stratec Medical, acquired by Johnson & Johnson
- Reinold Geiger, president and CEO of L'Occitane
- SP Hinduja Shanu, president of Hinduja bank in Switzerland
- André Hoffmann, shareholder of pharmaceutical company Hoffmann-La Roche
- Najib Mikati, founder of Investcom, former prime minister of Lebanon
- Wolfgang Marguerre, founder and chairman of Octapharma
- Henry Engelhardt, founder of Admiral Group
- Andreas Jacobs, chairman of the board of directors of INSEAD, member of the board of directors of Jacobs Holdings, former vice president of Adecco
- Jani Rautiainen, cofounder of PropertyGuru
- Kevin P. Ryan, cofounder and former CEO of DoubleClick, CEO of Gilt Groupe, cofounder of MongoDB, co-founder of Business Insider
- Tidjane Thiam, former CEO of Credit Suisse and Prudential
- Börje Ekholm, CEO of Ericsson
- André Calantzopoulos, CEO of Philip Morris International
- António Horta-Osório, CEO of Lloyds Banking Group, chairman of the board of directors of Credit Suisse
- Ben Keswick, chairman of the board of Jardine Matheson
- Bob van Dijk, CEO of Naspers
- Mark Read, CEO of WPP

=== Politics ===
- Claude Bartolone, President of the French Assemblée Nationale
- Johann Schneider-Ammann, former President of Switzerland
- Jusuf Kalla, former Vice President of Indonesia
- Najib Mikati, former Prime Minister of Lebanon
- Mamuka Bakhtadze, 13th Prime Minister of Georgia
- Wopke Hoekstra, Dutch Minister of Finance
- Bill Morneau, Minister of Finance of Canada
- Seamus O'Regan, Canada's Minister of Natural Resources
- William Hague, British Foreign Secretary

=== Others ===
- Andrew Noble, 2010 Winter Olympics Alpine Skiing competitor (INSEAD)
- Bernard de la Villardière, French journalist, radio and TV presenter (CELSA – PSU)
- Frédéric Beigbeder, French writer and literary critic (CELSA – PSU)
- Ulrich Robeiri, French épée fencer, World Champion in 2014, team Olympic Champion in 2008 (PMCU)
- Marie Gayot, French sprint athlete, 2014 European Athletics Championship 4 × 400 m relay gold medalist (UTC)
