= Systematic Paris-Region =

Systematic Paris-Region is an Île-de-France business cluster created in 2005, devoted to complex systems and ICT.

== History ==
During its first two years of operation, The cluster Systematic Paris-Region has launched 207 research projects representing 975 million euros of investments consisting of 380 million from state aid, from the Agence Nationale de la Recherche (ANR), Oséo and local authorities.

As of September 2011, Systematic Paris-Region has permitted the development of 318 collaborative R&D projects, at a total cost of 1.4 billion euros in R&D effort and a support revenue of about €500 million from the state (via the Fonds unique interministériel (Single Interministerial Fund)), national agencies, ANR, Oséo, EUREKA, ERDF and territorial collectivities.

The project of a French competitiveness cluster on free software was consigned to Systematic Paris-Region following the Comité interministériel d'aménagement et de développement du territoire (Interministerial Committee for the development and territorial competitiveness, CIADT) of July 5, 2007.

== Presentation ==
600 organizations are involved in the R&D network of the cluster: 366 SMEs-SMBs, 116 companies, 24 ETI, 79 research centers and educational institutions, 19 territorial authorities and 15 investors. The cluster brings together beyond the R&D collaborative ecosystem 1060 small and medium enterprises.

Since its inception in 2005, Systematic focuses its activity on the digital revolution for 6 markets :

- Automotive & Transportation,
- Telecom,
- Security & Defence, now called Digital Trust & Safety,
- Intelligent Energy Management,
- The technological heart of the cluster collects information and communication technology and the design tools and development systems necessary to design, develop, operate and manage an infrastructure, systems and equipment specific to each of these three application markets,
- The software is the core technology with, since 2007, a proactive strategy in the field of Free Software in order to bring together stakeholders in their Île-de-France communities and to promote the emergence of a thriving Free Software industry.

From 2009 to 2010, Systematic deploys its technologies and solutions to two new market areas which development is increasingly reliant on the expertise and know-how of Systematic and its members:

- ICT and Sustainable city in partnership with the poles and Advancity and Cap Digital; the priorities in this area are:
  - E-Services for the city;
  - Design tools and simulation for the building and the city;
  - Management systems and supervision of the building for the city and the environment;
  - Transport systems and mobility.
- ICT and Health, in partnership with the cluster Medicen, the priorities in this area are:
  - Modeling and simulation for the life sciences;
  - Medical imaging (computers, sensors, software for processing and analysis);
  - Telemedicine and medical supervision.

This deployment will be driven by existing theme groups with coordination and oversight arrangements between the partners clusters. 39 R&D projects have already been launched by Systematic Paris-Region, which are part of the new themes. Each thematic group division has updated its strategic roadmap by including the following new elements:

- Issues in 2011 in each group

Theme identified by prospective studies conducted in preparation of the strategic plan.

- Development areas and issues specific to the new spheres of cluster activities:
  - The ICT and sustainable city area was analyzed in 2009;
  - ICT and health field will be in 2010 with an update of this document.

In France, the first four themes of the cluster Systematic Paris-Region comprised no less than 320,000 employees, including 250,000 in services and 70,000 in industry. By itself, the software segment in complex systems represent a global market of 300 billion euros.
