= Open access in France =

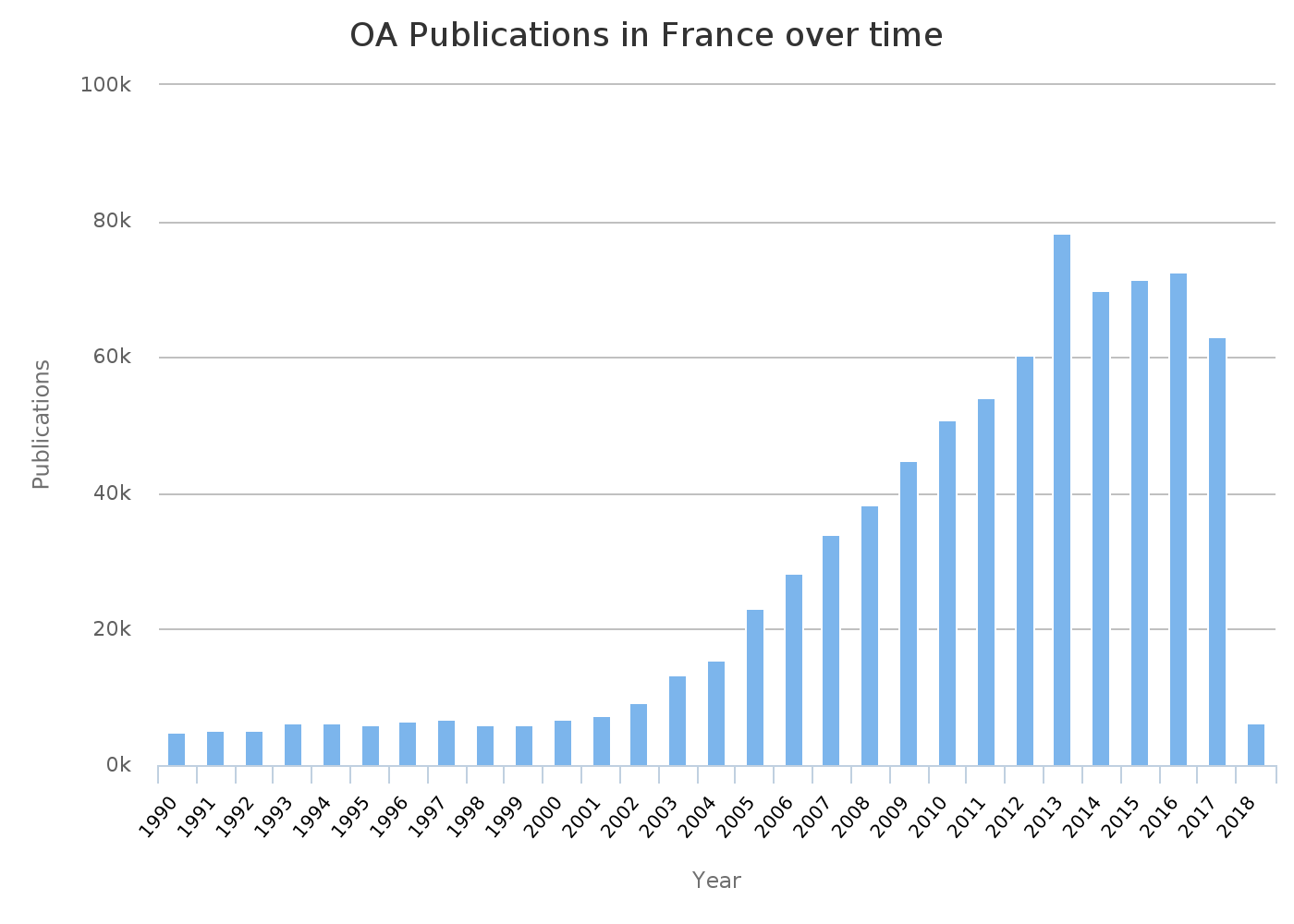
Growth of open access publications in France, 1990-2018

In France, open access to scholarly communication is relatively robust and has strong public support. Revues.org, a digital platform for social science and humanities publications, launched in 1999. Hyper Articles en Ligne (HAL) began in 2001. The French National Center for Scientific Research participated in 2003 in the creation of the influential Berlin Declaration on Open Access to Knowledge in the Sciences and Humanities. Publishers EDP Sciences and OpenEdition belong to the international Open Access Scholarly Publishers Association.

== Open Repositories ==
There are a number of collections of scholarship in France housed in digital open access repositories. They contain journal articles, book chapters, data, and other research outputs that are free to read. The main open repository platform in use for French higher education and research institutions is HAL. It hosts over 520 000 fulltext documents and about 1.5 million references. More than 120 institutions have opened their own institutional portals on the HAL platform.

== Open access publishing ==
France's main actor in open access publishing is Openedition. This set of publishing platforms is specialized in Human and Social Sciences. It hosts 490 journals, 5,600+ books, 2,600+ blogs and 39,000 events. Openedition is operated by an institutional unit called CLEO, and funded by the Centre national de la recherche scientifique, Ecole des hautes etudes en sciences sociales, Université d'Aix-Marseille, and Université d'Avignon et des Pays de Vaucluse. It uses a "freemium" business model for books and journals: most content is available in HTML format for free, and the other formats (pdf, epub) are available to the subscribed institutions.

== Timeline ==
Key events in the development of open access in France include the following:

- 1999
  - Creation of the Revues.org portal by Marin Dacos, with 2 open access journals
- 2001
  - 23 March: French Wikipedia, a French-language open educational resource, begins publication
  - HAL repository platform launched, operated by the CCSD
- 2005
  - HAL-Inria repository launched
- 2013
  - Signature of a partnership agreement in favour of open archives and HAL by French higher education and research institutions
- 2016
  - Law for a digital Republic, creating a right for the researchers to submit their accepted manuscripts to institutional repositories, eventually with an embargo period, even if they've signed a copyright transfer agreement.
- 2018
  - Consortium Couperin cancels its subscription to a bundle of several journals published by Springer Nature.
  - 4 July: French Minister for Higher Education, Research and Innovation Frédérique Vidal announces a National Plan for Open Science
  - 4 September: Researchers from France take part in the Europe-wide Plan S initiative.

== See also ==
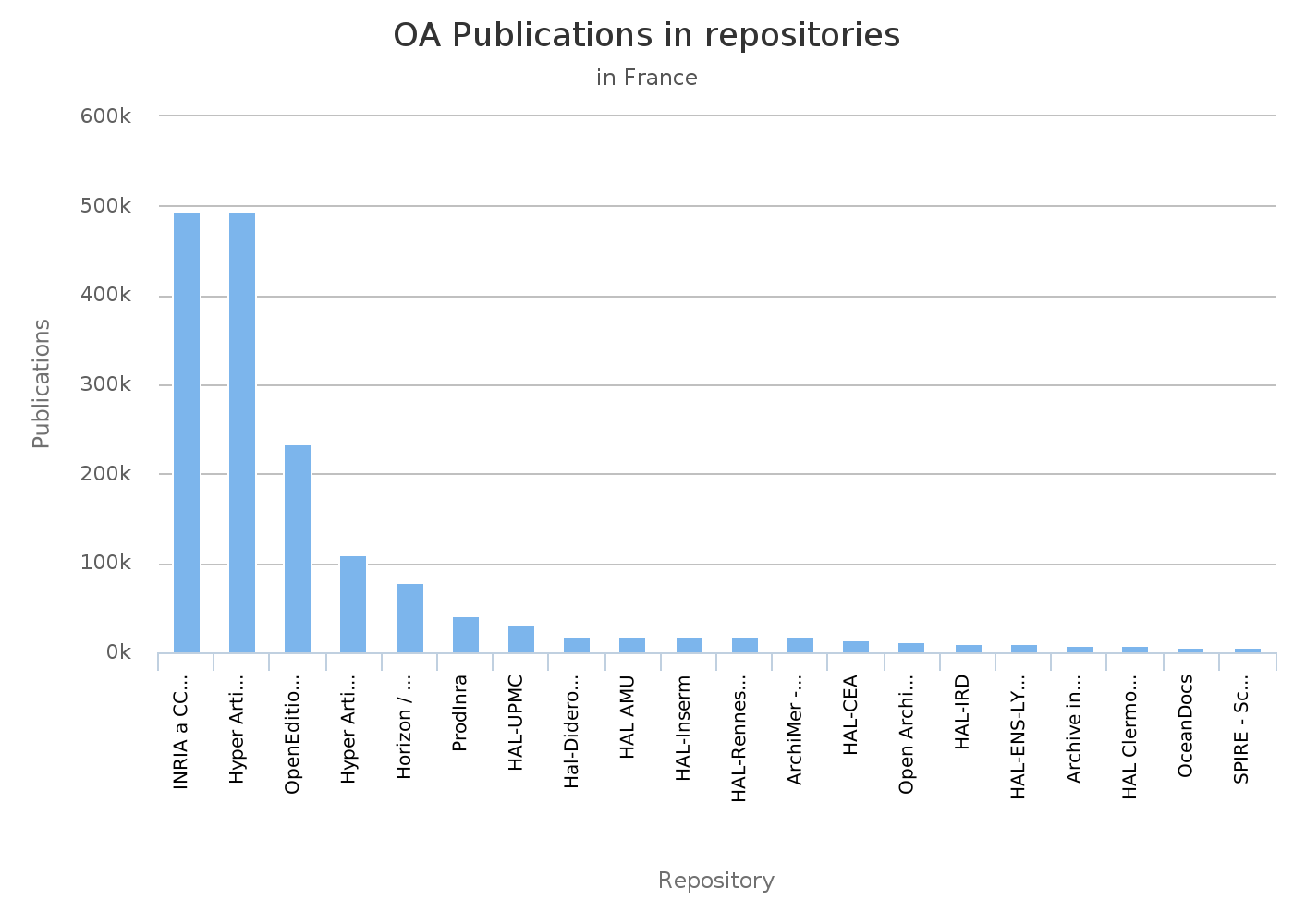
Number of open access publications in various French repositories, 2018

- Open data in France
- Internet in France
- Education in France
- Media of France
- Copyright law of France
- Science and technology in France
- Open access in other countries
