= Mohamed Naceur Ammar =

Tunisian politician

Mohamed Naceur Ammar (born 1957) is a Tunisian politician. He served as the Tunisian Minister of Communication Technologies under former President Zine El Abidine Ben Ali from January 2010 to January 2011.

== Biography ==
Mohamed Naceur Ammar was born in Dar Chaabane in 1957. He received a PhD, as well as degrees from the École Nationale Supérieure des Mines de Paris and from the École Polytechnique in France. He has taught at the Ecole Nationale Supérieure des Mines de Paris and at the Institut Préparatoire aux Etudes scientifiques et technique, a school at Carthage University. In 1997, he became the President of the Ecole Supérieure des Postes et des télécommunications de Tunis, and from 1998 to 2004, he served as founding President of the École supérieure des communications de Tunis, where he is still employed as a researcher. He was also involved with the Constitutional Democratic Rally.

In January 2010, he was appointed as the Tunisian Minister of Communication Technologies. He was deposed when former President Ben Ali stepped down in January 2011. He has said he supported the 2010–2011 Tunisian revolution.
