= Pierre and Marie Curie University =

Former French university existing from 1971 to 2017

- Université Pierre et Marie Curie – UPMC (Paris 6)
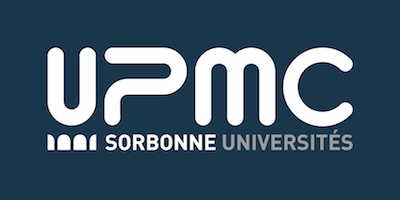
- Type: Public
- Active: 1 January 1971–31 December 2017
- Affiliations: Sorbonne University, CNRS, LERU, EUA
- Budget: 400 million euros (2013)
- President: Jean Chambaz
- Faculty: 7,000
- Administrative staff: 10,640
- Students: 32,000
- Location: Paris, France; 48°50′50″N 2°21′23″E
- Campus: Urban
- Nickname: Paris VI
- Website: www.upmc.fr
- Paris
- Merged with Paris-Sorbonne University in 2018 to become Sorbonne University

Pierre and Marie Curie University (French: Université Pierre-et-Marie-Curie [ynivɛʁsite pjɛʁ e maʁi kyʁi], UPMC), also known as Paris VI, was a public research university in Paris, France, from 1971 to 2017. The university was located on the Jussieu Campus in the Latin Quarter of the 5th arrondissement of Paris, France. UPMC merged with Paris-Sorbonne University into the new Sorbonne University in 2017.

== History ==
Paris VI was one of the inheritors of the faculty of Sciences of the University of Paris, which was divided into several universities in 1970 after the student protests of May 1968. In 1971, the five faculties of the former University of Paris (Paris VI as the Faculty of Sciences) were split and then re-formed into thirteen universities by the Faure Law. The campus of Paris VI was built in the 1950s and 1960s, on a site previously occupied by wine storehouses. The Dean, Marc Zamanski, saw the Jussieu campus standing as a tangible symbol of scientific thought in the heart of Paris, with the Faculty of Science, set in the Latin Quarter, as part of an intellectual and spiritual continuum linked to the university history of Paris. Paris 6 shared the Jussieu campus with the University of Paris 7 (Paris Diderot University) and the Paris Geophysical Institute (Institut de Physique du Globe).

In 1974, the University of Paris VI adopted the name Université Pierre et Marie Curie, after physicists Pierre and Marie Skłodowska Curie. In 2006, Pierre and Marie Curie University entered into a partnership with the government of the United Arab Emirates to create Paris-Sorbonne University Abu Dhabi, a spinoff in Abu Dhabi. In 2007, the university shortened its name to UPMC. In 2008 the university joined the association Paris Universitas changing its logo accordingly and adding the name of the association after its own.

UPMC was a large scientific and medical complex in France, active in many fields of research with scope and achievements at a high level. Several university rankings regularly put UPMC at the 1st place in France, and it had been ranked as one of the top universities in the world. The ARWU in 2014 ranked UPMC as the 1st in France, 6th in Europe and 35th in the world and also 4th in field of mathematics, 25th in field of physics, 14th in field of natural sciences and 32nd in field of engineering, technology and computer science.

UPMC had more than 125 laboratories, most of them in association with the Centre national de la recherche scientifique (CNRS). Some of its most notable institutes and laboratories include the Institut Henri Poincaré, Institut d'astrophysique de Paris, Laboratoire d'informatique de Paris 6 (LIP6), Institut de mathématiques de Jussieu (shared with University Paris-Diderot) and the Laboratoire Kastler-Brossel (shared with École Normale Supérieure).

The university's Faculty of Medicine Pierre and Marie Curie is located in two teaching hospitals, Pitié-Salpêtrière Hospital and Hôpital Saint-Antoine (the latter itself being the successor to Saint-Antoine-des-Champs Abbey).

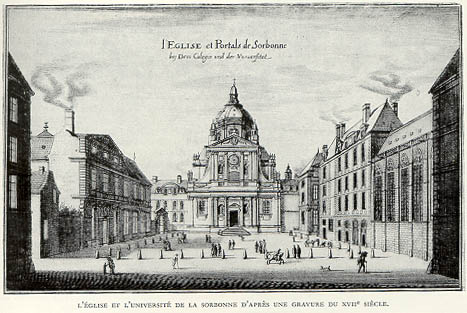
University of Paris (Sorbonne) at the 17th Century

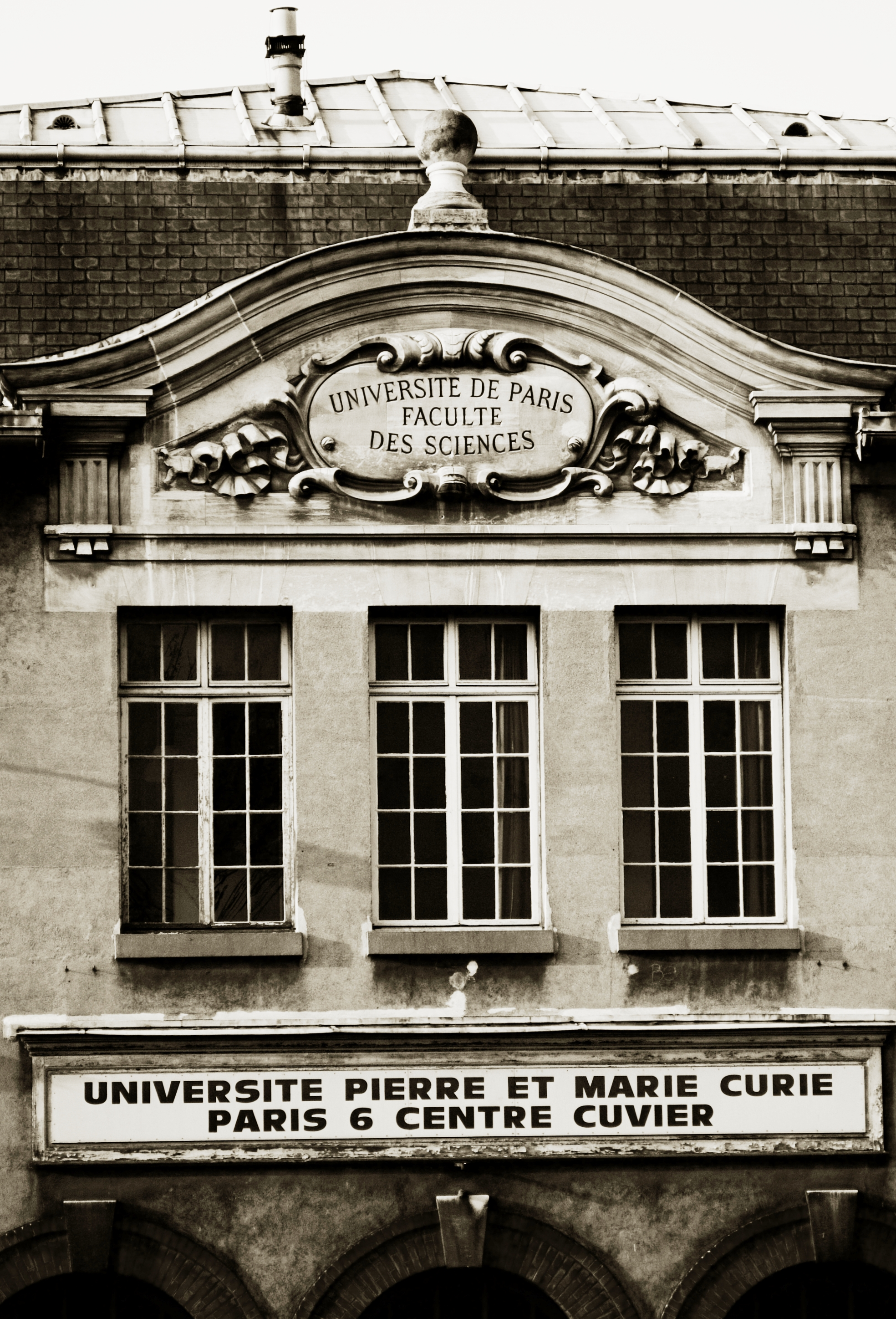
Historic View of university

== Dissolution ==
In 2010, the Sorbonne University group was created, including the Pantheon-Assas University, the Paris-Sorbonne University, the Muséum National d'Histoire Naturelle, the INSEAD, and the University of Technology of Compiègne; for this occasion the UPMC logo were changed again.

UPMC merged with Paris-Sorbonne University into a combined Sorbonne University on 1 January 2018.
