= Bioconversion =

Bioconversion, also known as biotransformation, is the conversion of organic materials, such as plant or animal waste, into usable products or energy sources by biological processes or agents, such as certain microorganisms. One example is the industrial production of cortisone, which one step is the bioconversion of progesterone to 11-alpha-Hydroxyprogesterone by Rhizopus nigricans. Another example is the bioconversion of glycerol to 1,3-propanediol, which is part of scientific research for many decades.

Another example of bioconversion is the conversion of organic materials, such as plant or animal waste, into usable products or energy sources by biological processes or agents, such as certain microorganisms, some detritivores or enzymes.

In the US, the Bioconversion Science and Technology group performs multidisciplinary R&D for the Department of Energy's (DOE) relevant applications of bioprocessing, especially with biomass. Bioprocessing combines the disciplines of chemical engineering, microbiology and biochemistry. The Group 's primary role is investigation of the use of microorganisms, microbial consortia and microbial enzymes in bioenergy research. New cellulosic ethanol conversion processes have enabled the variety and volume of feedstock that can be bioconverted to expand rapidly. Feedstock now includes materials derived from plant or animal waste such as paper, auto-fluff, tires, fabric, construction materials, municipal solid waste (MSW), sludge, sewage, etc.

== Three different processes for bioconversion ==
1 - Enzymatic hydrolysis - a single source of feedstock, switchgrass for example, is mixed with strong enzymes which convert a portion of cellulosic material into sugars which can then be fermented into ethanol. Genencor and Novozymes are two companies that have received United States government Department of Energy funding for research into reducing the cost of cellulase, a key enzyme in the production cellulosic ethanol by this process.

2 - Synthesis gas fermentation - a blend of feedstock, not exceeding 30% water, is gasified in a closed environment into a syngas containing mostly carbon monoxide and hydrogen. The cooled syngas is then converted into usable products through exposure to bacteria or other catalysts. BRI Energy, LLC is a company whose pilot plant in Fayetteville, Arkansas is currently using synthesis gas fermentation to convert a variety of waste into ethanol. After gasification, anaerobic bacteria (Clostridium ljungdahlii) are used to convert the syngas (CO, CO_{2}, and H_{2}) into ethanol. The heat generated by gasification is also used to co-generate excess electricity.

3 - C.O.R.S. and Grub Composting are sustainable technologies that employ organisms that feed on organic matter to reduce and convert organic waste in to high quality feedstuff and oil rich material for the biodiesel industry. Organizations pioneering this approach to waste management are EAWAG, ESR International, Prota Culture and BIOCONVERSION that created the e-CORS® system to meet large scale organic waste management needs and environmental sustainability in both urban and livestock farming reality. This type of engineered system introduces a substantial innovation represented by the automatic modulation of the treatment, able to adapt conditions of the system to the biology of the scavenger used, improving their performances and the power of this technology.
