= Open data in France =

Online access to legal information was implemented in France in 1999 and complemented in 2002. In that regard, France has been at the forefront of Open Data in Europe.

Civic groups like Wikimedia France, OpenStreetMap France, Libertic or Regards Citoyens had been lobbying for Open Data for many years before public administrations took action.

Amongst public administrations, some cities pioneered the change: Rennes, then Paris thanks to the decision taken by the municipal council on June 8, 2010 relative to the publication of public data and the "Paris Data" portal made public on January 27, 2011.

The inter-ministerial Task Force "Etalab", under the authority of the Prime Minister, is in charge of creating and updating the portal for public Open Data data.gouv.fr, which has been made available since December 5, 2011 and hosts more than 19,000 datasets.

The role of Chief Data Officer in the French public administration was created by decree of September 16, 2014. The Chief Data Officer's attributions were specified so that "He/she may request from administrations that they hand over the inventory of the data they produce, receive, or collect. He/she shall hand in to the Prime Minister a yearly report on the inventory, the governance, the production, the dissemination and the use of data by administrations. Finally, he/she is authorized to conduct experimentations on the use of data, to reinforce the efficiency of public policies, to contribute to a better management of public spending and resources, and to improve the quality of public services provided to citizens."

The Open Data Barometer, a project of the Web Foundation, had France ranked 10th in 2013, 4th in 2014 and 2d in 2015. The Open Knowledge Foundation created in 2013 the Open Data Index which compares data availability across countries in which France was ranked 16th in 2013, 3rd in 2014 and 10th in 2015.

== Legal framework ==
=== Laws applicable in France and public data ===
==== Founding principles of Open data ====
The right to access public data is inscribed in the Declaration of rights of man and of the citizen of 1789, under the article XV which mentions that "The society has the right of requesting account from any public agent of its administration." According to the preamble of the Constitution of the French Fifth Republic (adopted on 4 October 1958, and the current constitution), the principles set forth in the Declaration have constitutional value today.

==== Law on the liberty of access to administrative documents (1978) ====
Law 78-753 of July 17, 1978 on the liberty of access to public information in France (for the most part abrogated in 2015) did not require public administrations to publish their numerical data, nor to proactively publish information.

Nonetheless, it implemented a cornerstone for open public data by broadly and precisely defining administrative documents as "whatever their date, their place of conservation, their type or their support, the documents produced or received, within their exercise of the public tasks, by the State, the territorial collectivities and the other legal persons under public law or the legal persons under private law tasked with such public tasks. Are constitutive of such documents files, reports, studies, minutes of meetings and proceedings, statistics, directives, instructions, circulars, notes and ministerial responses, correspondence, notices, previsions and decisions."

It required administrative documents that were not under elaboration to be communicated to "those who asked for it".

==== European directive of 2003 ====
In 2003, directive 2003/98/EC of the European Parliament and of the Council of 17 November 2003 details the conditions for use of public sector information. It is transposed into French law in 2005, so as to facilitate the use of existing documents or data held by public organizations.

==== Decree of 2011 ====
In 2011, the decree 2011-577 of May 26 relative to the re-use of public sector information sets forth the principle of gratuity of re-use of public sector data and documents. Under this decree, an administrative agency may consider applying licence fees to the re-use of the State's immaterial property such as data, but this decision must be published by decree after consultation of the Public edition and Administrative Information Council.

==== Bill on a Digital Republic ====
The bill was jointly prepared with Internet users before being submitted to the Council of State and adopted by the Council of Ministers. It was adopted on January 26, 2016.

It moved forward the access to public data by:

- widening the online publication of administrative documents. This will limit the communication on demand of administrative documents, made universally available on the Internet;
- stating the principle according to which public information that has been communicated or made public will be freely re-usable for other purposes than the public tasks for which they were produced or received;
- introducing the notion of general interest data making private companies in charge of a public tasks clearly fall under the administrative document and public information regime.

==== Data on energy ====
In order to implement at their level the law on Energy Transition, many agents including territorial collectivities and citizens need access to updated and precise data on the production of energy and the effective consumption of energy by building, neighborhood, city, etc. while abiding by the rules on the protection of private data.

The law on Energy Transition has those data become progressively accessible online for free re-use by any party (open data). The network operators (electricity, gas, heat and coal networks) and the providers of fuel products must provide certain data to the Statistics service of the Ministry of Energy every year by the June 30. These will be in turn published online within two months (before September 1). Legal provisions have been made through three decrees published in 2016 relative to the confidentiality of some information.

=== Licences ===
Under French law, public data is likely to contain sensitive information, either because it allows the identification of a person, or because it is subject to copyright, State secret or considerations of national defense. In this context, data must at the very least be made anonymous before being published.

Once the publication rights are clear, licences will apply. Various organizations have elaborated free licences applicable to all types of content and audiences. These are templates and need not be conformed to.

In France, up to five different licences for data re-use have been set fort. In 2013, the harmonization of practices has led to two equally used licences: the Licence Ouverte and the Open Database Licence.

==== Licence Ouverte ====
This licence created by ETALAB, the French Prime Minister's task force for Public Data is meant to be used widely in France. The website data.gouv.fr operates under this licence.

==== Open Database License (ODbL) ====
The ODbL licence has been translated into French by the city of Paris so as to adapt it to a national use. A variety of projects have been using this licence, from OpenStreetMap to local authorities (Paris, Nantes, Toulouse...).

== See also ==
- Open access in France
