= Bouebdelli University =

- Type: Private
- Established: 1992
- Rector: Mehdi Bouebdelli
- Academic staff: 200
- Location: Tunis, Tunisia
- Website: www.bouebdelli-university.com

The Bouebdelli University (BU), formerly known as the Tunisia Private University (ULT), is a university in Tunis, Tunisia. It was founded in 1992 and is organized in six faculties.

== Organization ==
These are the six faculties, schools and institute in the university:

1. Faculty of Law and Economics
2. Faculty of Literature, Arts and Humanities Science
3. Polytechnic Institute
4. School of Architecture and Design
5. School of Business
6. International Language School (I.L.S.)

== Profile ==
Bouebdelli University (BU) is the first private university created in Tunisia. It was officially recognized by the Tunisian government (through the Ministry of Higher Education) according to law n° 73 of 2000.

One central part of ULT is the school of Electronics and Automatics created in 1973 by M. Mohamed Boussaïri Bouebdelli. In 1992 the higher education studies were set up at ULT.

It is an accredited member of the Association of Arab Universities (AAU) and the International Association of Universities (IAU-UNESCO).

BU is accredited by the Islamic Educational Scientific and Cultural Organisation (IESCO).

Students from over 30 countries are studying at the ULT. The university currently has 200 staff and faculty.

== See also ==
- List of colleges and universities
- Tunis
