= University of Technology of Compiègne =

French institute of technology

- Université de Technologie de Compiègne
- Motto: Meaning to Innovation
- Type: Public university, Grande Ecole
- Established: 1972
- Endowment: €82.4 millions (2016)
- President: Claire Rossi (2022-)
- Academic staff: 450 (2024)
- Administrative staff: 400 (2024)
- Students: 4,400 (2024)
- Doctoral students: 270 (2024)
- Location: Compiègne, France; 49.4002°N 2.7996°E
- Campus: Urban, 19 acres (7.7 ha)
- Colours: Gold and grey
- Website: www.utc.fr
- Location in France

The University of Technology of Compiègne (French: Université de Technologie de Compiègne, UTC) is a public research university located in Compiègne, France. The university has both the status of public university and grande école. It was founded in 1972 as the first experimental Institute of Technology in France. There are now two other universities of technology in France, that form the UT Group: UTT in Troyes and UTBM in Belfort-Montbéliard.

A fundamental principle of the UTC is the education of both engineers and citizens inspired by humanist philosophy. Beyond an education in basic sciences (e.g. mathematics, theoretical physics) and engineering sciences (e.g. thermodynamics, polymer physics), the curriculum also has a strong emphasis on humanities and social sciences (e.g. philosophy, history of science and engineering, journalism). The overarching goal is to form humanist scientists and technologists capable of solving problems within a conscious and ethical framework of environmental, social, and societal consequences.

== Academic model ==
The university teaching model is a mix between North American and French traditions. The overall curriculum is five years: The first two years are dedicated to basic sciences, while the last three years are focused to engineering sciences. Students typically enter directly after the Baccalauréat, but can also integrate the engineering schools during the third year. Students form their own curriculum by selecting their classes, which are complemented by assisted classwork (French: Travaux dirigés) and applied laboratory work (French: Travaux pratiques).

The university is organised into five Schools of Engineering, namely of (in alphabetical order) Biological Engineering, Computational engineering, Mechanical engineering, Process engineering, and Urban engineering. The university comprises 8 Research Units within the different Schools of Engineering and offers around 30 degree programs in twenty fields, leading to different bachelor's, master's, and doctorate degrees. The university is accredited by the Commission des Titres d'Ingénieur to deliver both the Diplôme d'ingénieur and the academic title of Ingénieur Diplomé.

It also hosts 2 Erasmus Mundus Joint Masters (EPOG+ and EMSSE), alongside other prestigious universities throughout Europe.

== Distinctions ==
In 2017, Usine nouvelle ranked UTC No. 2 amongst 107 French engineering schools and universities. In 2016, Usine nouvelle had ranked UTC No. 1 in France for highest number of startup creation by students and recent alumni. The UTC has been ranked No. 1 in France for highest median earnings by recent alumni in 2016 with L'Étudiant.

The university is a founding member of Sorbonne University Alliance, a group composed of French leading academic and research institutions, which alumni and faculty include 19 Nobel laureates and 7 Fields Medalists. It is also a founding member of the Sunrise Alliance, created in 2024 and funded by the European Union, with other smaller-sized universities in non-metropolitan areas.

== Research ==
UTC has established six areas of research as institute priorities: biotechnology, energy and the environment, nanotechnology, computation and information technology, and media and the arts.

UTC is home to 8 research units:

- Applied mathematics (LMAC)
- Avenues (Multiscale modelling of urban systems)
- BMBI (Bio-mechanics and bio-engineering), with CNRS and UPJV
- Costech (Knowledge, organization and technical systems)
- Heudiasyc (Heuristics and diagnostics for complex systems), with CNRS
- GEC (Enzyme and cell engineering), with CNRS
- Roberval (Mechanics, energy and electricity)
- TIMR (Integrated transformation of renewable matter), with ESCOM

== Campus ==
UTC's 6-hectare (15-acre) campus is part of the city of Compiègne, 80 kilometres (50 mi) north of Paris, and overlooks the Oise River with a blend of traditional and modern architecture. The university is one among a small group of French technological universities which tend to be primarily devoted to the instruction of technical arts and sciences.

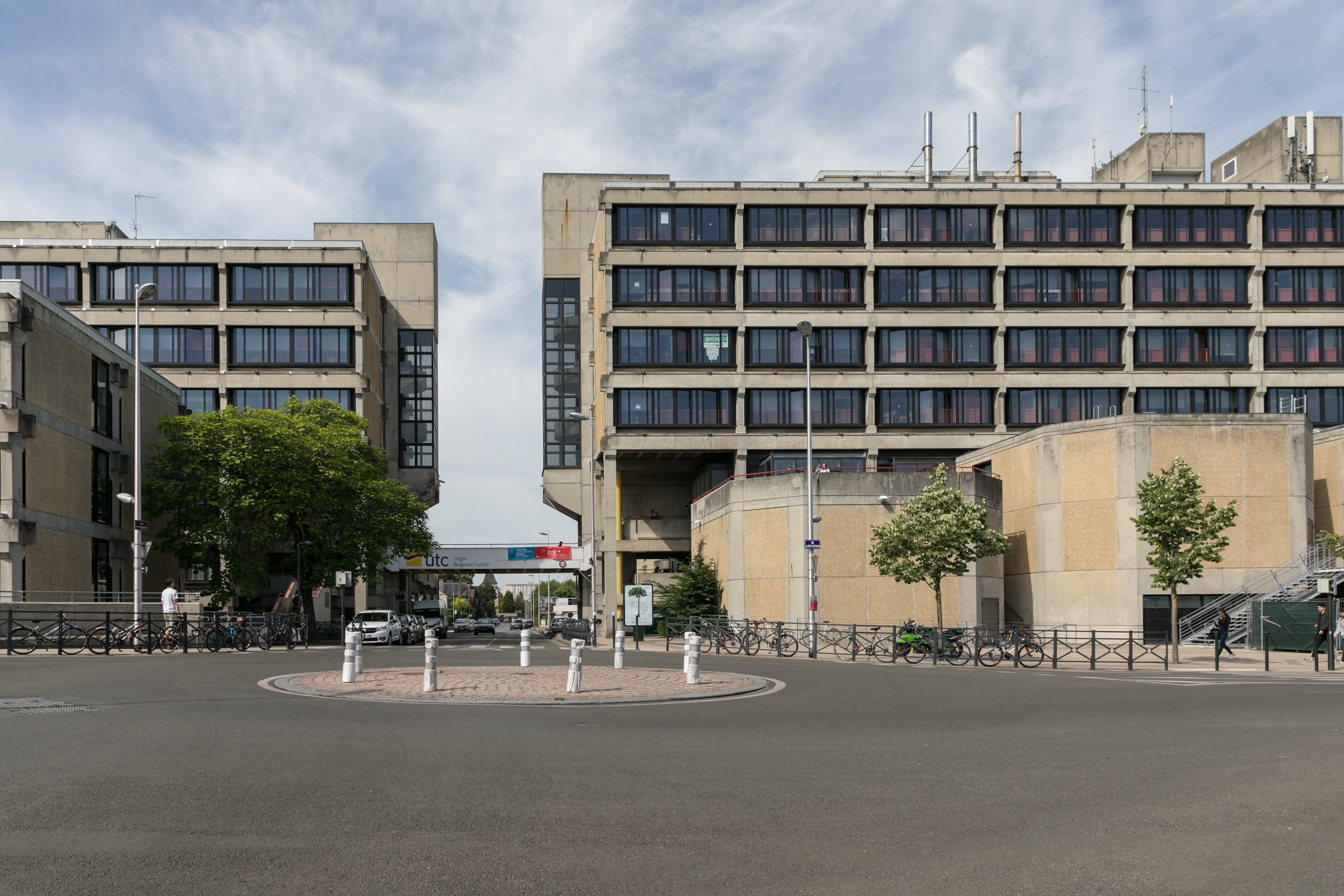
The UTC from outside (Benjamin Franklin building)

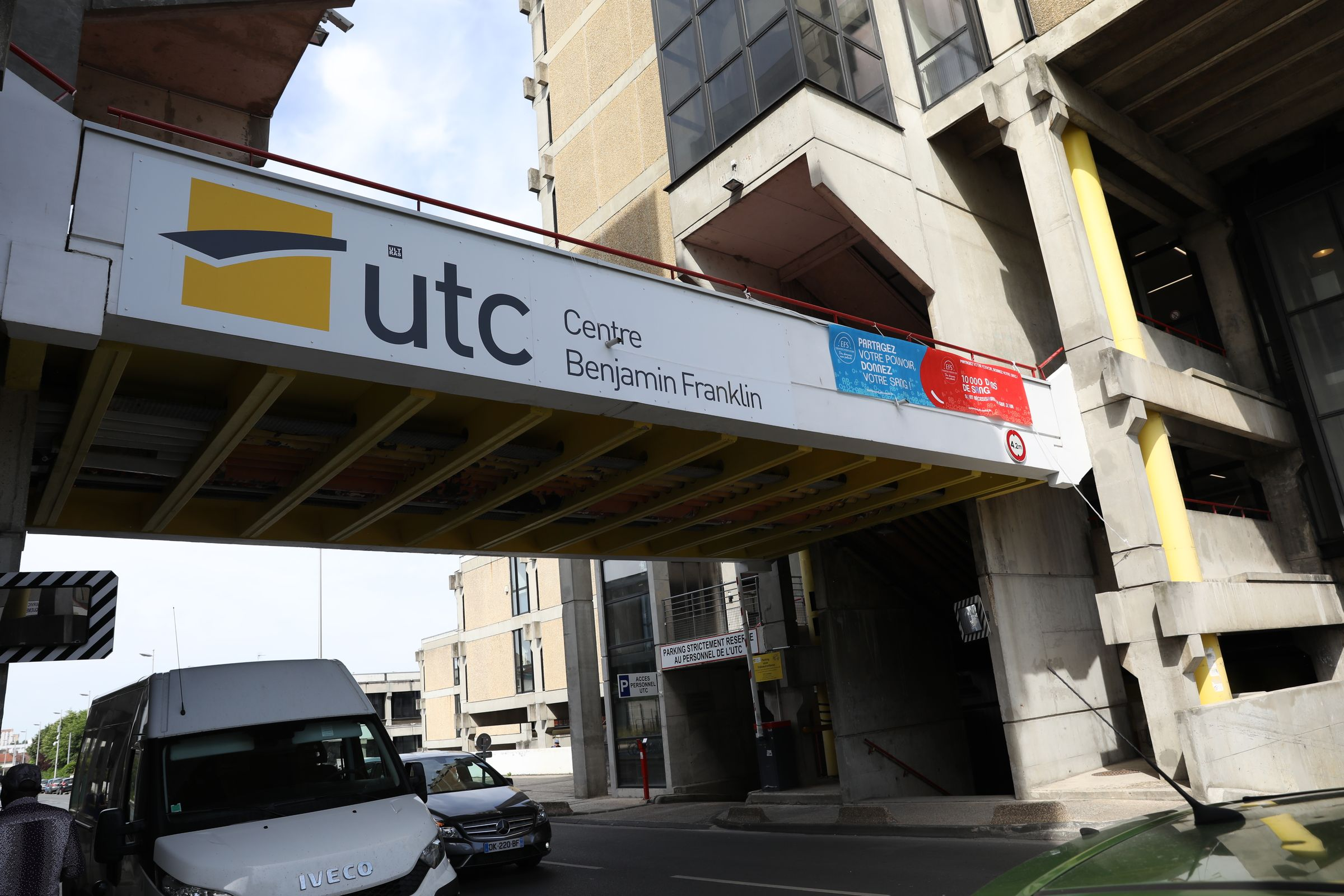
Overpass bridge between two buildings

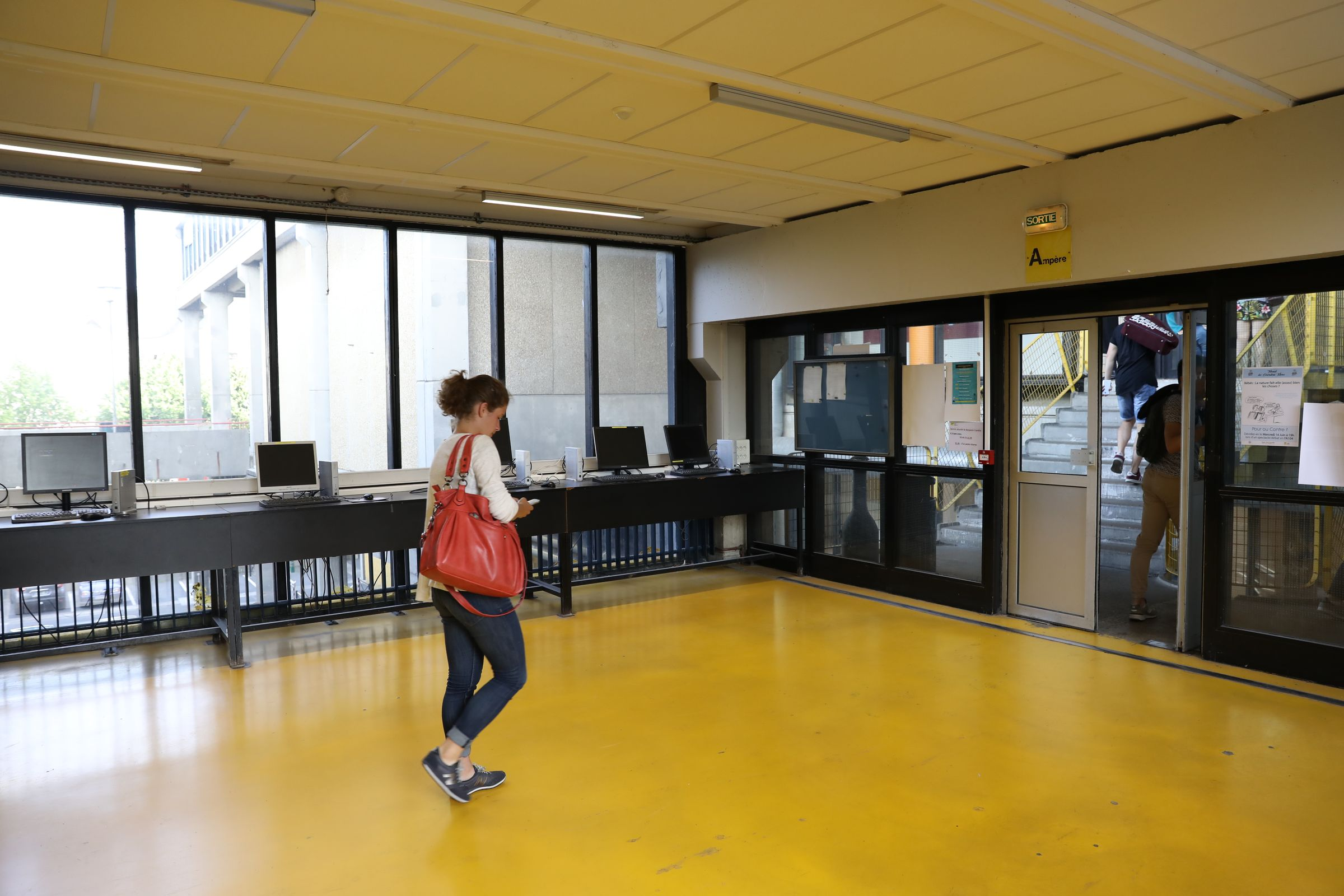
Inside the university, with yellow floor

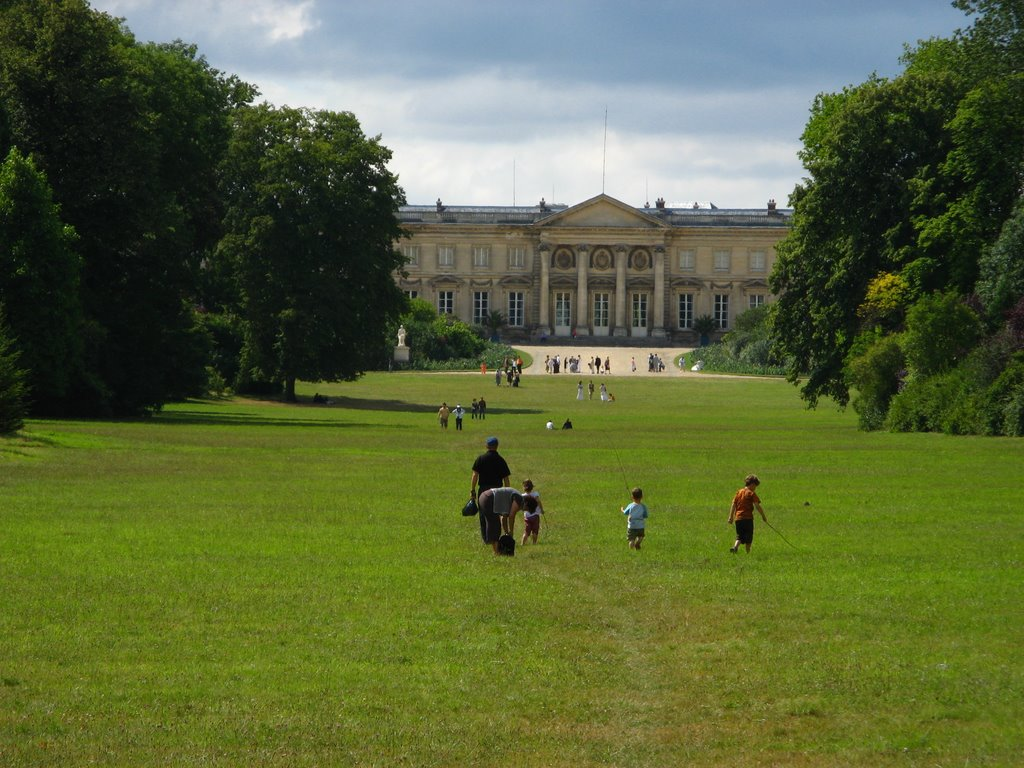
Château de Compiègne, view from the park

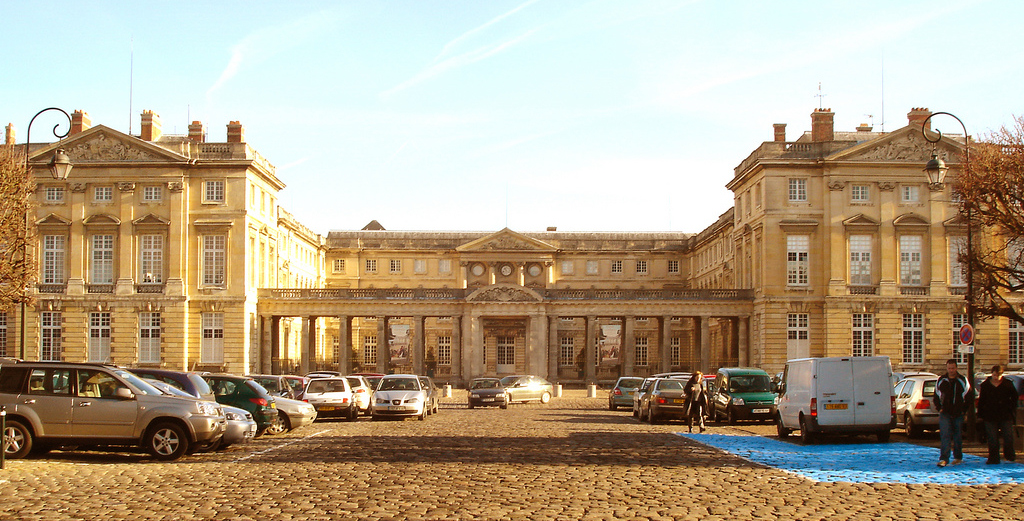
Château de Compiègne, view from the city

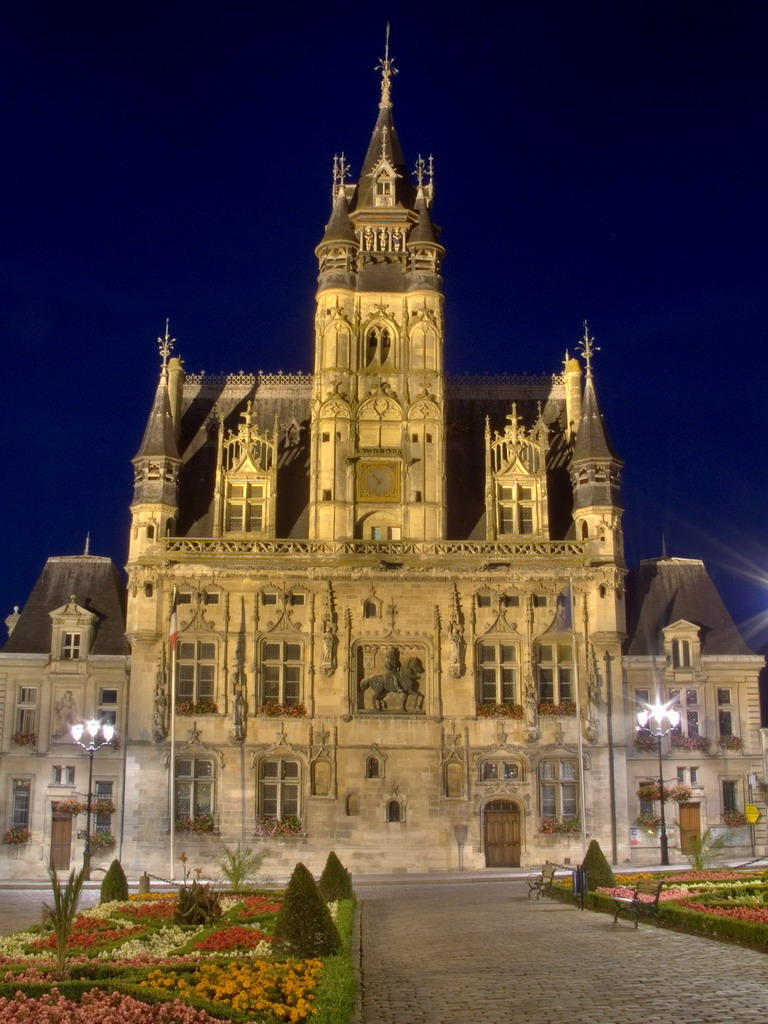
City Hall

== Faculty ==
There are more than 28 300 UTC alumni (in 2024).

Notable alumni and faculty includes:

- Julien Bahain, rower, winner of the bronze medal in the 2008 Summer Olympics
- Frédéric Y. Bois, French scientist
- Marie Gayot, sprint athlete, urban planning student
- Vanessa Proux, president of the Institut Sup'Biotech de Paris
- Cécile Réal, French bio-medical engineer and businessperson
- Lamia Chafei Seghaier, Tunisian engineer and politician
- Thierry St-Cyr, former Canadian politician
- Bernard Stiegler, founder and director of the COSTECH research lab

== International ==
In 2005, UTC created with Shanghai University, UTT and UTBM the Sino-European School of Technology (UTSEUS), a multi-disciplinary structure devoted to foundational engineering education, research, and innovation. This school has grown and counts more than 1200 students, including its students in Shanghai and in France. Its missions are to train high-level specialists in a trilingual and bicultural environment, Chinese and French, by implementing the French engineering education system, and to promote research cooperation between Shanghai University and UTC.

204 partnership with world-wide universities are in place, and 40 double degrees (in 2024). 15% of students were incoming mobilities (in 2024).

== See also ==
- List of public universities in France by academy
- Université de Technologie
- The University of Technology of Troyes (Université de Technologie de Troyes or UTT)
- The University of Technology of Belfort-Montbéliard (Université de Technologie de Belfort-Montbéliard or UTBM)
