= Michel Caboche =

French biologist (1946–2021)

Michel Caboche (25 April 1946 - 15 March 2021) , was a French biologist, director of research at Institut national de la recherche agronomique (INRA), member of the French Academy of Sciences and of the Scientific Council of the Parliamentary Office for the Assessment of Scientific and Technological Choices (OPECST).

He was deputy director of the INRA-(INA-PG) Seed Biology Laboratory in Versailles, and headed the INRA-CNRS-University of Evry Joint Unit for Plant Genomics Research from 2002 to 2007. He was chairman of the board of the French plant genomics program, Génoplante, from its 1999 inception to 2002. He was a member of the steering committee of the Fondation Écologie d'Avenir.

Caboche graduated from the École polytechnique and held a doctorate in science.

== Works ==
Caboche's research focused on plant biology, in particular nitrate metabolism, growth processes and seed filling.

== Awards and honours ==
- Philip Morris Science Prize (1990)
- Member of the French Academy of sciences (correspondent in 1993 and member in 2004)
- Member of Academia Europaea (1991)
- Member of EMBO (1995)
- Max Planck Society and Alexander von Humboldt Foundation Prize for International Cooperation (1996)
- Associate Member of the Royal Academy of Belgium (1999)
- Chevalier of the Ordre national du Mérite (2004)
- Chevalier of the Ordre national de la Légion d'honneur (2010)
