= Cap Digital =

French business cluster

Agency overview
- Formed: 2006
- Headquarters: Paris, France
- Agency executive: Henri Verdier, President
- Website: www.capdigital.com

Cap Digital is a business cluster, started in 2006, a French public agency dedicated to the development of the Innovative Economy in the Île-de-France region, and in France.

== Governance ==
- President : Henri Verdier, directeur général MFG-R&D
- Vice-Presidents: Stéphane Distinguin, Fondateur FaberNovel, concepteur de la Cantine; Francis Jutand, Institut Télécom; Catherine Lucet, Directrice pôle éducation Editis
- Treasurer: Olivier Muron, Directeur des Relations Institutionnelles d’Orange Labs R&D (France Telecom)
- Chief Executive Officer: Patrick Cocquet
- Services: Carlos Cunha
- Community: Françoise Colaïtis
- Think Digital: Jean-Baptiste Soufron
