= Medicen =

Medicen (also called Medicen Paris Region) is a French business cluster created in 2005 and located in Île-de-France. Its main focus is Biomedical engineering.

It brings together 13 major companies, 138 small and medium enterprises, 28 research centers, and universities.

The cluster is dedicated to biological and clinical research to find new drugs and gene therapies. The Medicen Paris Region has six thematic priorities. Three of these themes are for therapeutic purposes: nervous system disease, Cancer, and infectious diseases. The other three focus on technology: molecular medicine, biomedical Imaging and Science and Technology.
