= Pierre-Nicolas Legrand de Lérant =

French painter (1758–1829)

Pierre-Nicolas Sicot, known as Legrand de Lérant or de Sérant (French: [pjɛʁ nikɔla siko]; Pont-l'Évêque, 1758 – Bern, 1829), was a French painter.

Pupil of Jean-Baptiste Descamps at the École régionale des beaux-arts de Rouen, along with Beljambe and Lequeu, Legrand won a second extraordinary prize in drawing, at age only 15. In 1782, he went to the École nationale supérieure des Beaux-Arts.

c. 1794, Legrand de Sérant departed for Bern, where he produced a variety of drawings for local notabilities and illustrated a novel by Isabelle de Charrière.

Legrand de Sérant was a member of the Academy of Lille.

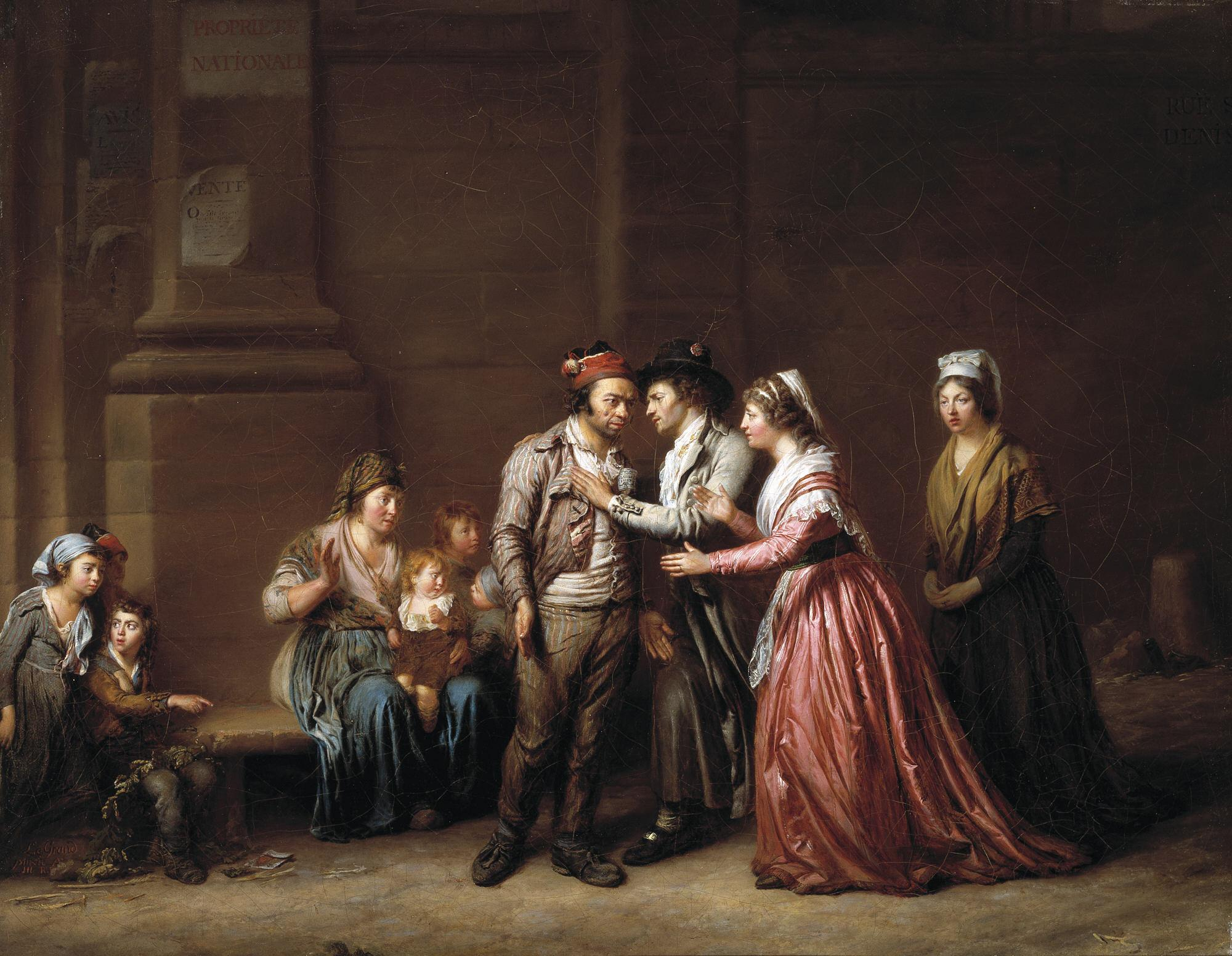
A Good Deed is Never Forgotten (1794-1795) Dallas Museum of Art, oil on canvas 63 x 80 cm

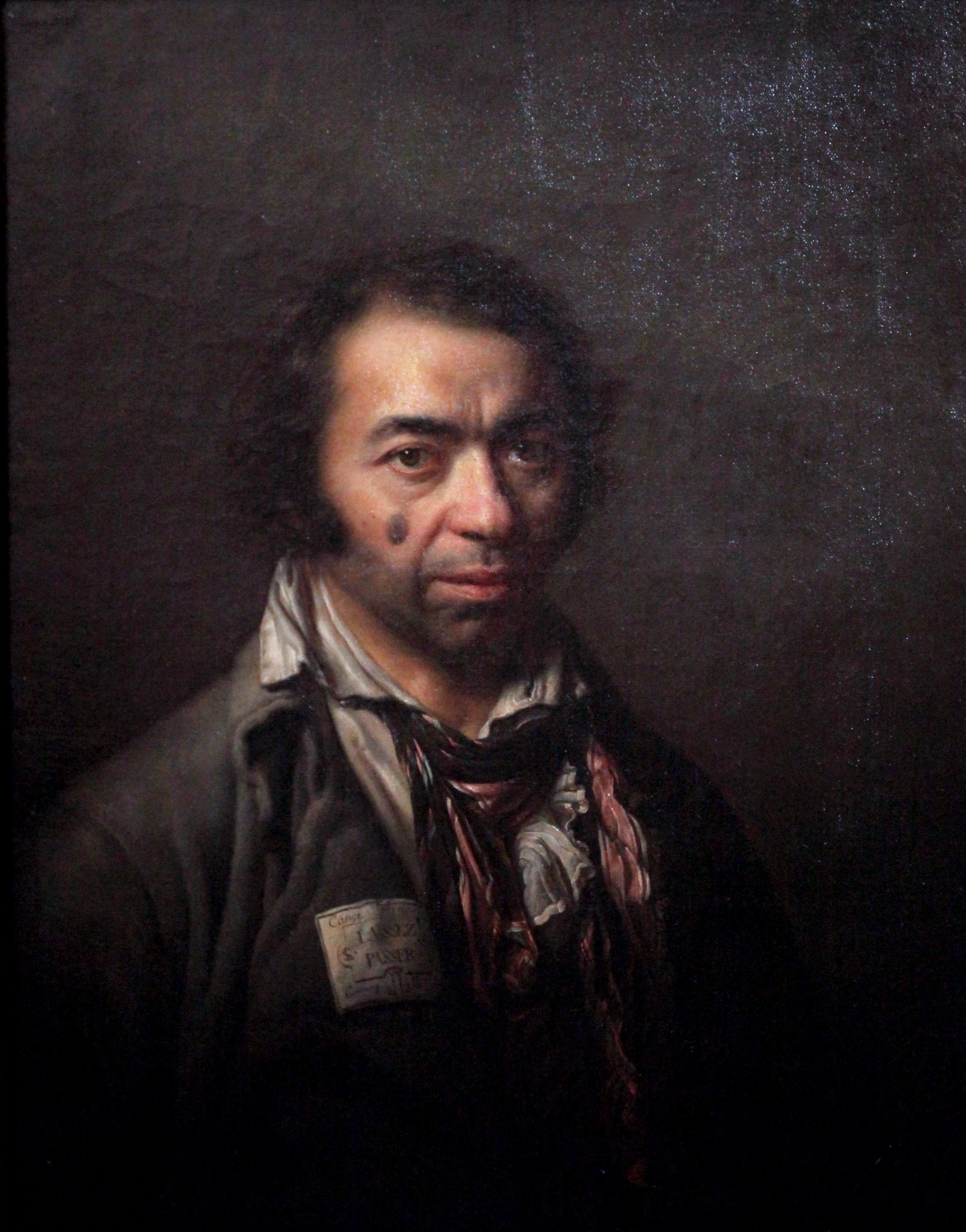
Joseph Cange, messenger of Prison Saint-Lazare, 1795 Musée de la Révolution française

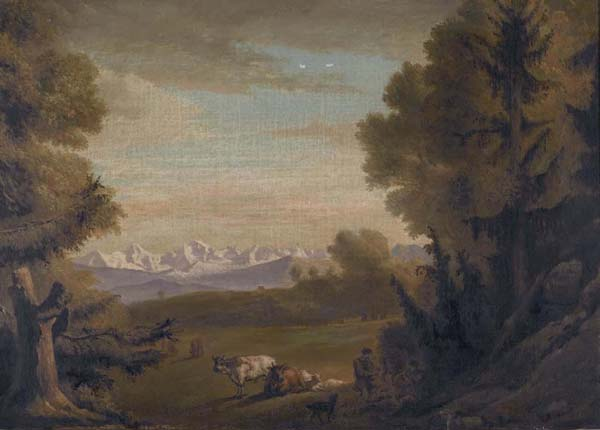
Berner Alpen, ca. 1800

== Sources ==
- Adolphe Siret, Dictionnaire historique et raisonné des peintres de toutes les écoles depuis les temps les plus reculés jusqu’à nos jours, Bruxelles, Périchon, 1844, 1856, p. 442.
