= Seret =

Seret may refer to:

- Seret (river), a tributary of the Dniester in Ternopil Oblast, Ukraine
- Seret (Drohobych), a small tributary of the Tysmenytsia in Drohobych, Lviv Oblast, Ukraine
- Seret (Hasidic dynasty)
- Seret (Dogu'a Tembien), a place in Ethiopia

== People with the surname ==
- Jean-Luc Seret, French chess player

== See also ==
- Siret (disambiguation)
- Joseph Alfred Serret
