= Hôtel de Ville, Villejuif =

Town hall in Villejuif, France

Hôtel de Ville
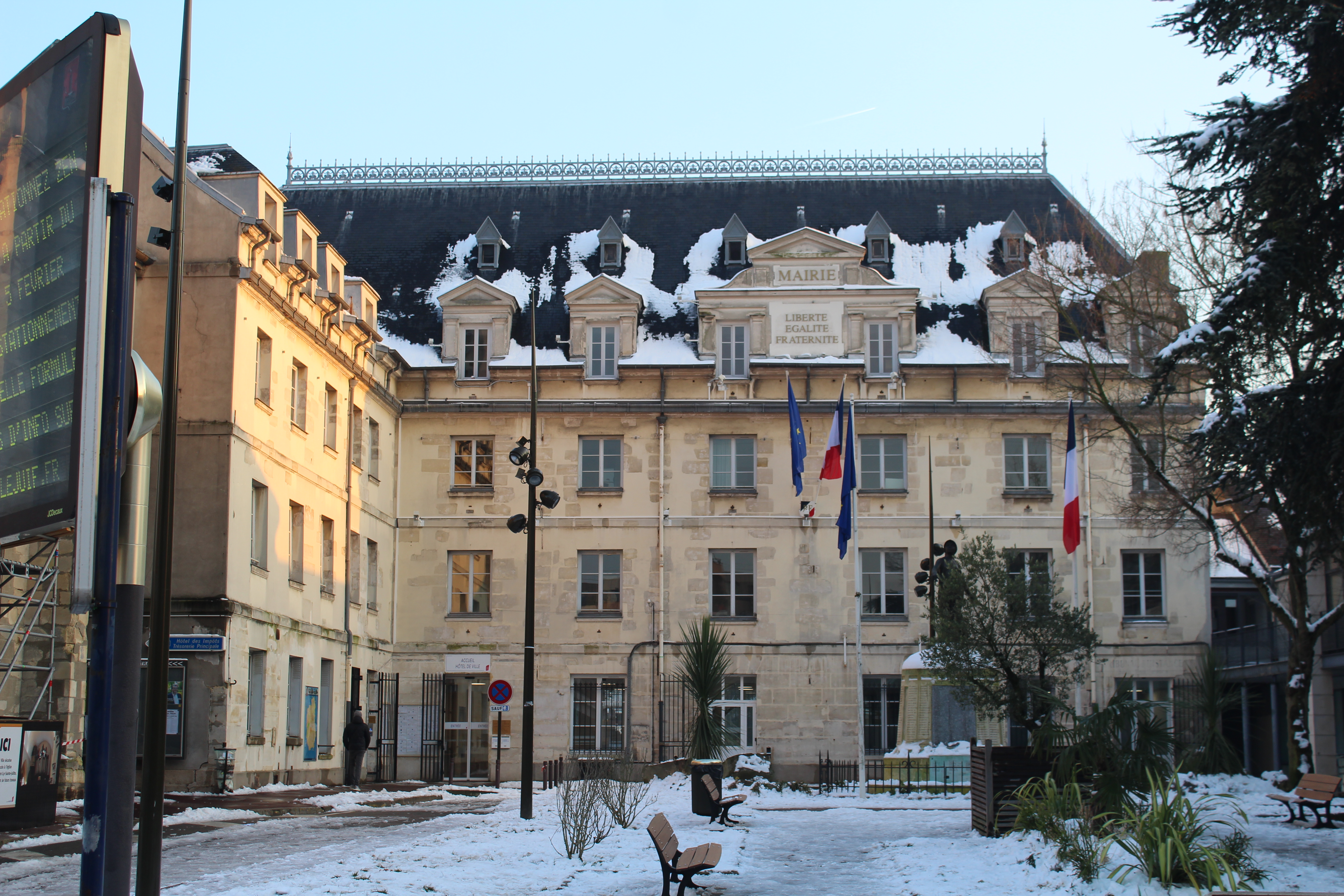
- The main frontage of the Hôtel de Ville in February 2018
- Interactive map of the Hôtel de Ville area

General information
- Type: City hall
- Architectural style: Neoclassical style
- Location: Villejuif, France
- Coordinates: 48.7919°N 2.3637°E
- Completed: 1608

The Hôtel de Ville (French pronunciation: [otɛl də vil], City Hall) is a municipal building in Villejuif, Val-de-Marne, in the southern suburbs of Paris, standing on Place de la Mairie. It has been included on the Inventaire général des monuments by the French Ministry of Culture since 1996.

== History ==
The building was commissioned as a dormitory for priests serving at the nearby Church of Saint-Cyr-Sainte-Julitte, Villejuif, which dates from the 13th century. The building was designed in the neoclassical style, built in ashlar stone and was completed in 1608.

A priest, Adrien Bourdoise (1584–1655), founded a seminary there in December 1620. His vision was to have all the priests of the local parishes living together so that there was a common spirit of charity and selflessness. The status of the seminary was confirmed by letters patent from the Archbishop of Paris, Jean-François de Gondi, in 1644. The seminary was expanded in the second half of the 17th century, and again in the first half of the 18th century. It accommodated approximately 100 students at the start of the 18th century. It continued to operate until the French Revolution, when the building was seized by the state and the priests were transferred to the Seminary of Saint-Fermin before being killed in the September Massacres of 1792.

In November 1792, the building was acquired by the commune of Bourg-la-Reine, which sold it to a consortium established by Messrs. Demetz, Champoulot and Garnier to accommodate people suffering from mental health problems brought on by political persecution. It was acquired by a language professor, Louis-Charles Parmentier, in the early 19th century and, following Parmentier's bankruptcy, it was acquired by Sieur Orban in February 1833. Orban agree to sell it to the town council of Villejuif for FFr60,000 in May 1840. After appropriate conversion works had been carried out to a design by Sieur Molinos, it re-opened as the local town hall in 1845.

The design, by that time, involved a block of six bays facing northwest, and another, newer block of five bays facing southwest. Both buildings were fenestrated by simple casement windows on three floors. There was also a row of dormer windows at attic level. Internally, the principal room was the Salle du Conseil (council chamber). Hearings of the local justices of the peace were transferred from an outbuilding of the Château de Villejuif to the new town hall at the same time.

A bronze statue, designed by Raymond Chrétien and intended to commemorate the lives of local people who died in the First World War, was unveiled outside the town hall on 1 November 1923.

During the Second World War, the town hall concierge, Louise Plaud, lived in the lodge on the ground floor of the town hall with her husband, Auguste Plaud, who also worked for the council. In September 1941, their son, René Plaud, was arrested by members of the Special Brigades on suspicion of being a member of the French Resistance. After the town hall lodge and René's own flat had been searched for incriminating evidence, René was sent to Clairvaux Prison and later shot dead on orders of the Vichy Regime, while Auguste was sent to Neuengamme concentration camp where he also died.

On 13 November 2015, the foyer of the town hall was badly damaged in a fire started by arsonists during the November 2015 Paris attacks.
