= Front rouge =

1930s Communist newspaper in France

- Type: Semi-monthly
- Founded: 1933
- Ceased publication: 1939
- Relaunched: 1941?
- Political alignment: French Communist Party
- Language: French language
- Headquarters: Villejuif
- Circulation: 6,000 (1937)

Front rouge ('Red Front') was a communist semi-monthly newspaper published from Villejuif, France, published 1933–1939. Paul Vaillant-Couturier was the editor-in-chief of the newspaper. In 1935 it had a circulation of 4,700, by 1937 the circulation had reached 6,000.

Front rouge was published irregularly as an underground publication during the Second World War.
