= Hôtel de la Capitainerie des Chasses =

Historic Monument in Villejuif, France

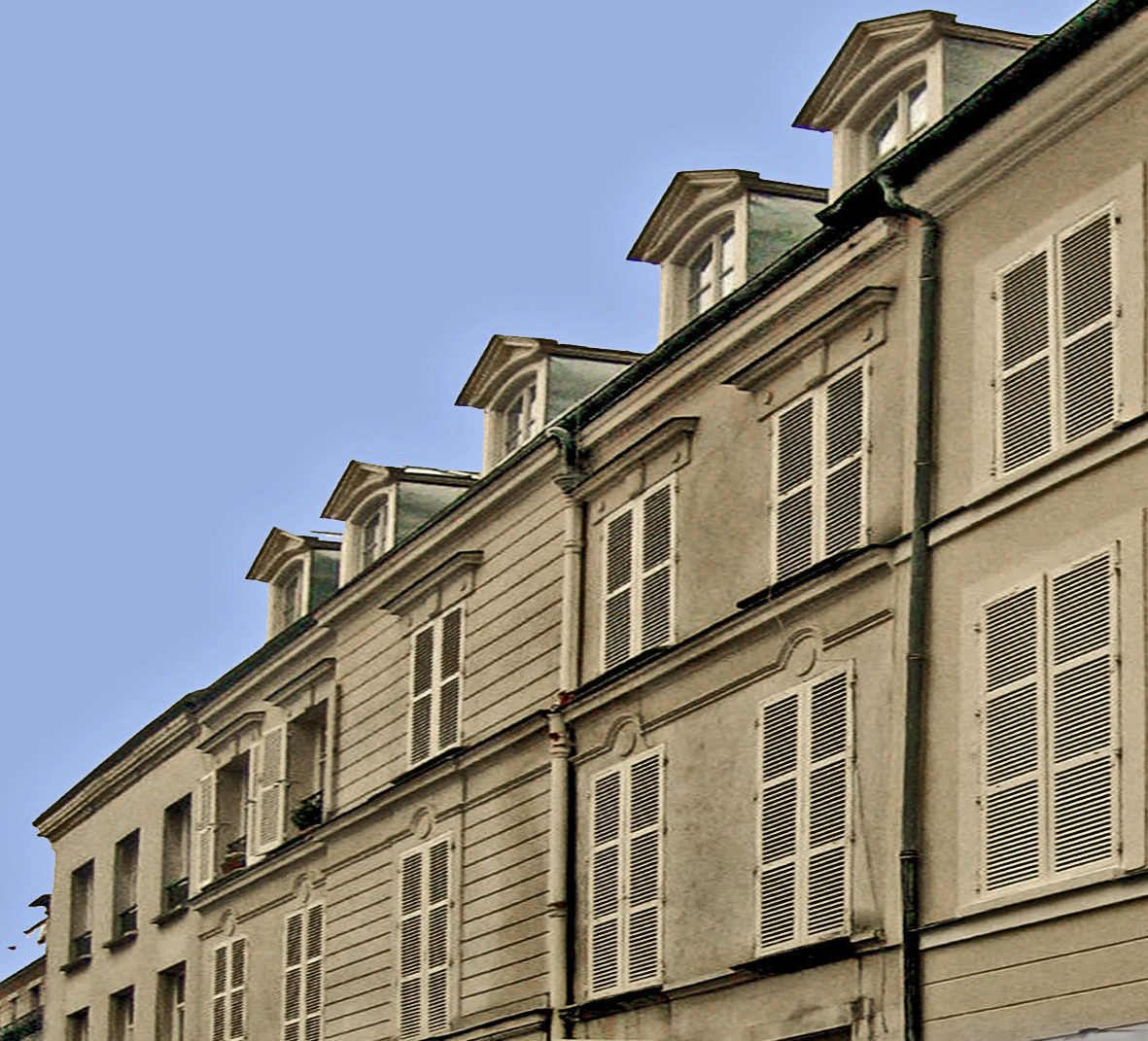

- Location within Paris and inner ring
- 48°47′32″N 2°22′00″E
- Type: Hôtel particulier
- Location: Villejuif, Val-de-Marne, France

History
- Built: Around 1760; Around 1834

Site notes
- Owner: Jacques Alexandre Gautier de Vinfrais (until 1797)

Monument historique
- Official name: Ancien hôtel de la Capitainerie des Chasses
- Criteria: Registered MH
- Designated: September 17, 1996
- Reference no.: PA94000003

The Hôtel de la Capitainerie des Chasses ('Hunting Master's Office Hotel') is a hôtel particulier and Historic Monument in Villejuif in the Val-de-Marne department, France.

== History ==
The hotel was built around 1762 for Jacques Alexandre Gauthier de Vinfrais, hunting inspector of the Varenne du Louvre bailiwick and commander of the Gendarmerie brigade at Villejuif. Vinfrais sold out the hotel in 1797.

His son-in-law, the deputy Thomas de Treil de Pardailhan, resided there from 1782 to 1795.

In 1834, the hôtel particulier was split into three separate buildings. The facade was altered around 1834.

In the early 19th century, the Villejuif city council decided to locate its municipal garage there, later replaced by the municipal technical center.

The facades, the roof, the coachway and the central staircase of the building were listed as a Historic Monument on September 17, 1996.
