= Pierre Beljambe =

Pierre Guillaume Alexandre Beljambe (10 May 1759 - 9 March 1838) was a prolific French artist, stipple engraver and burin engraver. Some biographies spell his surname Bellejambe, Belejambe or Beljame - in 1824 his two sons (one of whom had a university career) won authorisation to change their surname to Beljame.

== Life ==
He was born in Rouen, in whose art school he first studied drawing. His tutors there included Descamps and he won the institution's first prize in 1771. He then completed his artistic training at the École des Beaux-Arts de Paris from 1779 to 1782 under the tutelage of Cochin. He was a member of the academies in Rouen, Caen and Orléans. He died in Paris in 1838.

He produced engravings after Bellini's Circumcision of Christ, Veronese's The Adoration of the Kings and Happy Love, Danloux's An Old Man Ogling A Young Woman and An Old Man Threatening a Young Woman Mocking Him, Regnault's Cupid Sleeping on Psyche's Breast, Reni's Susanna and the Elders, Michelangelo's Holy Family, Charles Monnet's portrait of Jean Sylvain Bailly (the mayor of Paris), Legrand's The Virtuous Joseph Cange, Jean-Baptiste Greuze's Joseph Chrétien and La Petite Nanette and Cauvet's The Heroism of Love and Love's Victims

== Sources ==
- (in French) Ferdinand Hoefer, Nouvelle Biographie générale, t. 5, Paris, Firmin-Didot, 1855, p. 245.
- (in French) Charles Le Blanc, Jacques-Charles Brunet, Manuel de l’amateur d’estampes, t. 1, Paris, Jannet, 1854, p. 250-1.
