= Siret (disambiguation) =

Siret is a town in Suceava County, Romania.

Siret may also refer to:

- Siret (river), in Romania and Ukraine
- Siret (surname)
- SIRET code, a French code identifying the location of businesses
- Siret Kotka, Estonian politician
