= Tysmenytsia (river) =

River in western Ukraine

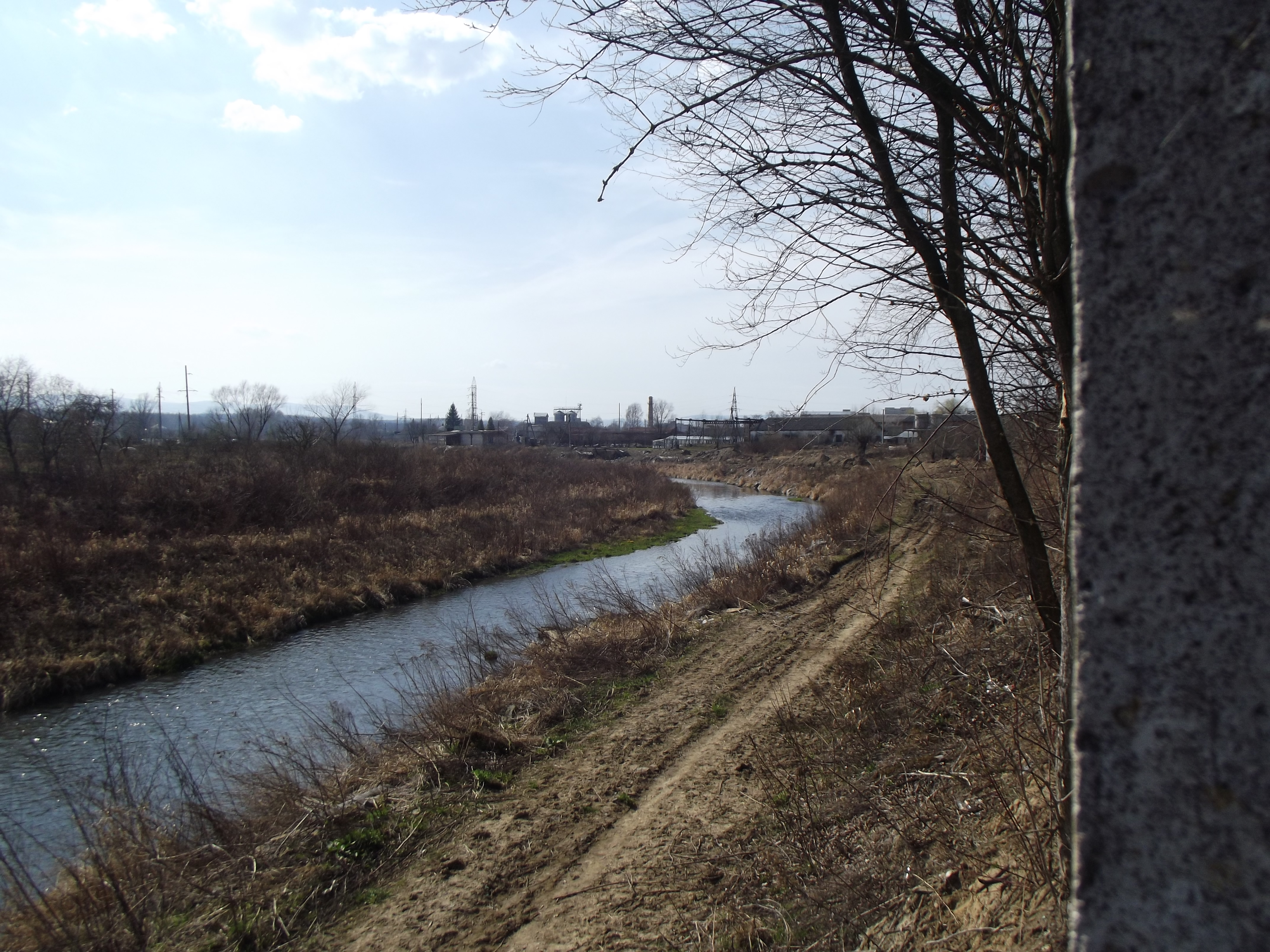
- The river near Drohobych
- Native name: Тисмениця (Ukrainian)

Location
- Region: Lviv Oblast, Ukraine

Physical characteristics
- Source
  - location: near Boryslav
  - coordinates: 49°13′51″N 23°25′15″E
- Mouth: Bystrytsia Tysmenytska
  - coordinates: 49°20′48″N 23°32′23″E
- Length: 49 km (30 mi)
- Basin size: 650 km^{2} (250 sq mi)

Basin features
- Progression: Bystrytsia Tysmenytska→ Dniester→ Dniester Estuary→ Black Sea

The Tysmenytsia (Ukrainian: Тисмениця) is a river in western Ukraine, and is a part of the Dniester basin. The river is a tributary of the Bystrytsia Tysmenytska and flows through parts of Lviv Oblast.

The river has a total length of 49 kilometres (30 mi), and a basin size of 650 square kilometres (250 sq mi). A common activity at the river is fishing.
