= Gentilly station =

Railway station in Gentilly, France

Gentilly
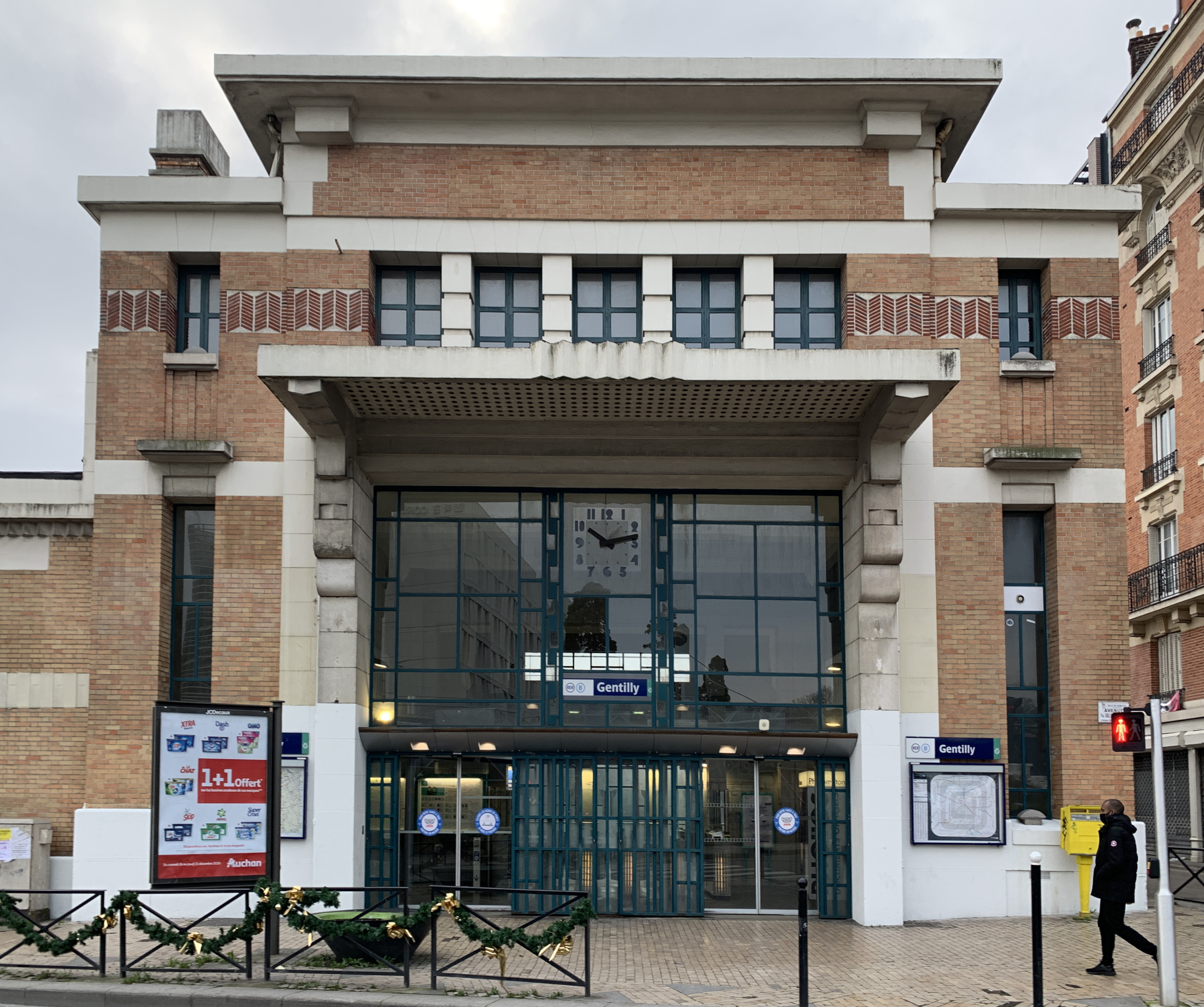
- Entrance to the station

General information
- Location: 73 Avenue Paul Vaillant Couturier; Gentilly; France
- Coordinates: 48°48′58″N 2°20′26″E
- Operator: RATP Group
- Line: Ligne de Sceaux
- Platforms: 2 side platforms
- Tracks: 2
- Connections: RATP Bus: 125; Valouette: V5

Construction
- Structure type: Below-grade
- Accessible: Yes, by request to staff

Other information
- Station code: 87758656
- Fare zone: 2

History
- Opened: 7 June 1846

Passengers
- 2019: 2,415,990

Services
Preceding station	RER	Following station
Cité Universitaire towards Aéroport Charles de Gaulle 2 TGV or Mitry–Claye	RER B	Laplace towards Robinson or Saint-Rémy-lès-Chevreuse
Location

Gentilly station is a station on the line B of the Réseau Express Régional, a hybrid suburban commuter and rapid transit line. It is named after the city of Gentilly where the station is located.

== History ==
The Compagnie du Paris-Orléans (PO) commissioned the Gentilly station in 1891, when the Sceaux line was put on normal track gauge (before the Ligne de Sceaux used a special large gauge). It was a simple halt, perhaps an enlarged gatekeeper's house.

The current passenger building was built in 1933 by the company's architect, Louis Brachet. It is located at the end of the tunnel dug from 1935, during work to remove the level crossings of the Sceaux line, by engineers from the Compagnie du PO. Indeed, the removal of the level crossing which cut the boulevard Jourdan at the level of the Cité Universitaire required major works including the creation of a 520-meter underground tunnel passage under the City park and the reconstruction of the Gentilly and Cité Universitaire stations.

== Railway situation ==
Established at an altitude of 72 m, Gentilly station is located on the RER B line, in the eponymous town, in the immediate vicinity of the "Periphérique" and therefore of Paris. It is built just outside the tunnel from Paris, in a trench open, in a slight upward curve with 2 lateral platform. The station is located at "Point Kilometrique"(PK) 8.158 (southern ending of platform)

There are two accesses:

- To the north, the main entrance at Avenue Paul Vaillant Couturier
- To the south, the entrance on the railway bridge

== Connection ==
The station is served by:

- RATP Bus: 125
- Valouette: V5

== Gallery ==
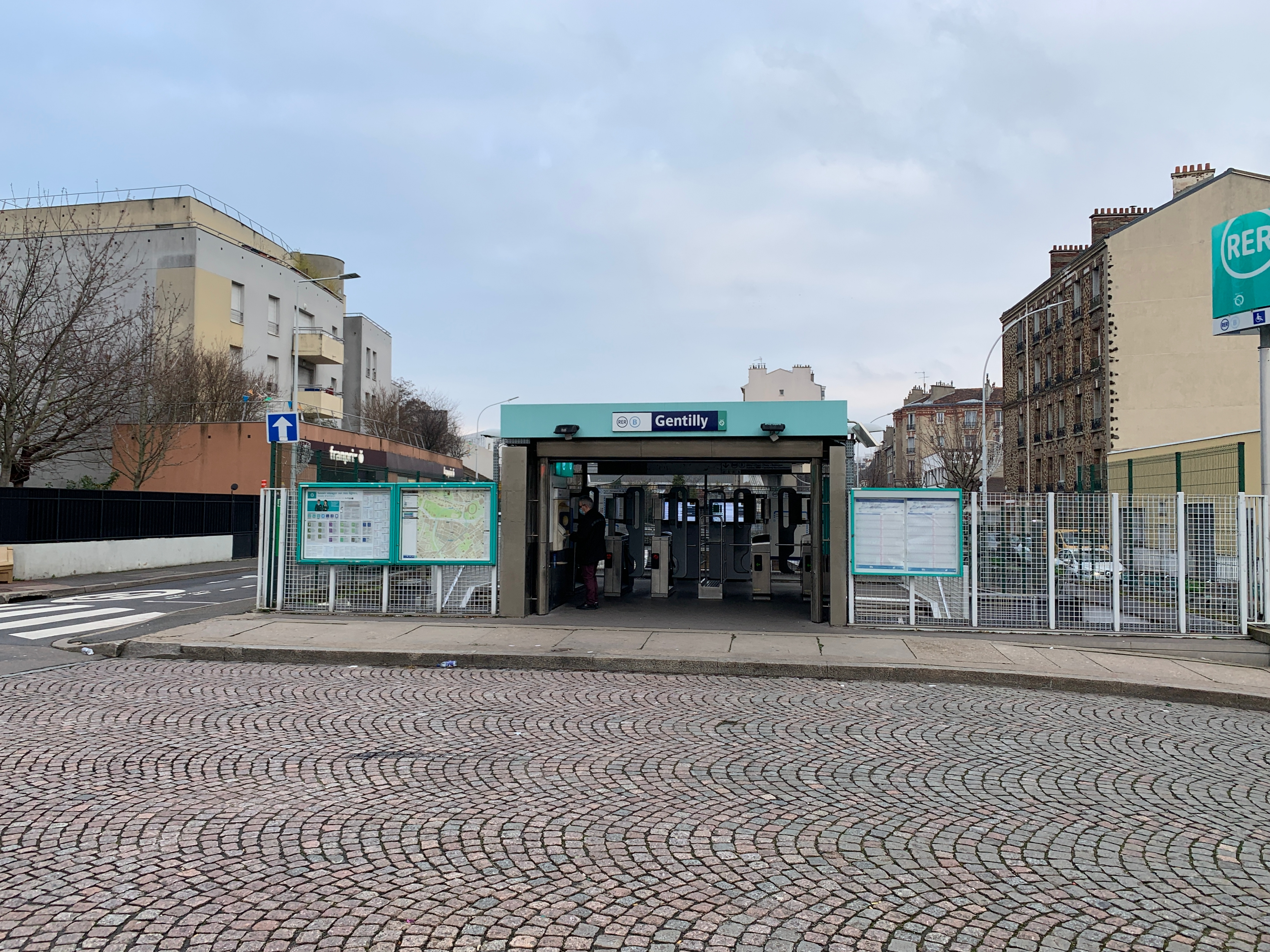
South Exit

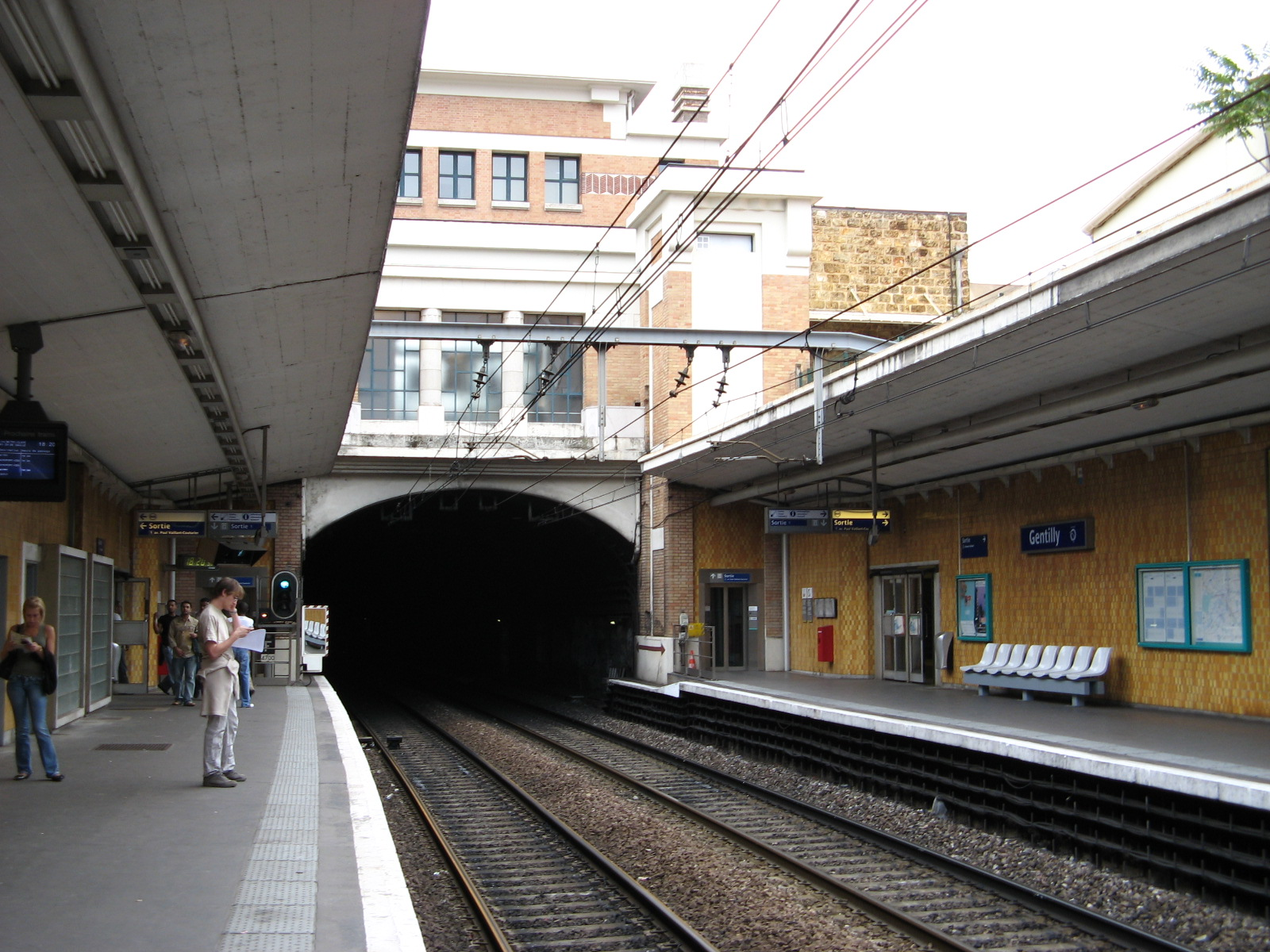
view to the north and the tunnel entrance

== See also ==
- List of stations of the Paris RER
