= Siret (surname) =

Siret is a surname. Notable people with this surname include:

- Luis Siret (1860–1934), a Belgian-Spanish archaeologist and illustrator
- Nicolas Siret (1663–1754), a French composer and organist
- Adolphe Siret (1818–1888), Belgian historian, biographer, essayist, poet and writer
- Pierre-Louis Siret (1745–1798), French grammarian and philologist
