= Cité Universitaire station =

Railway station in Paris, France

Cité Universitaire
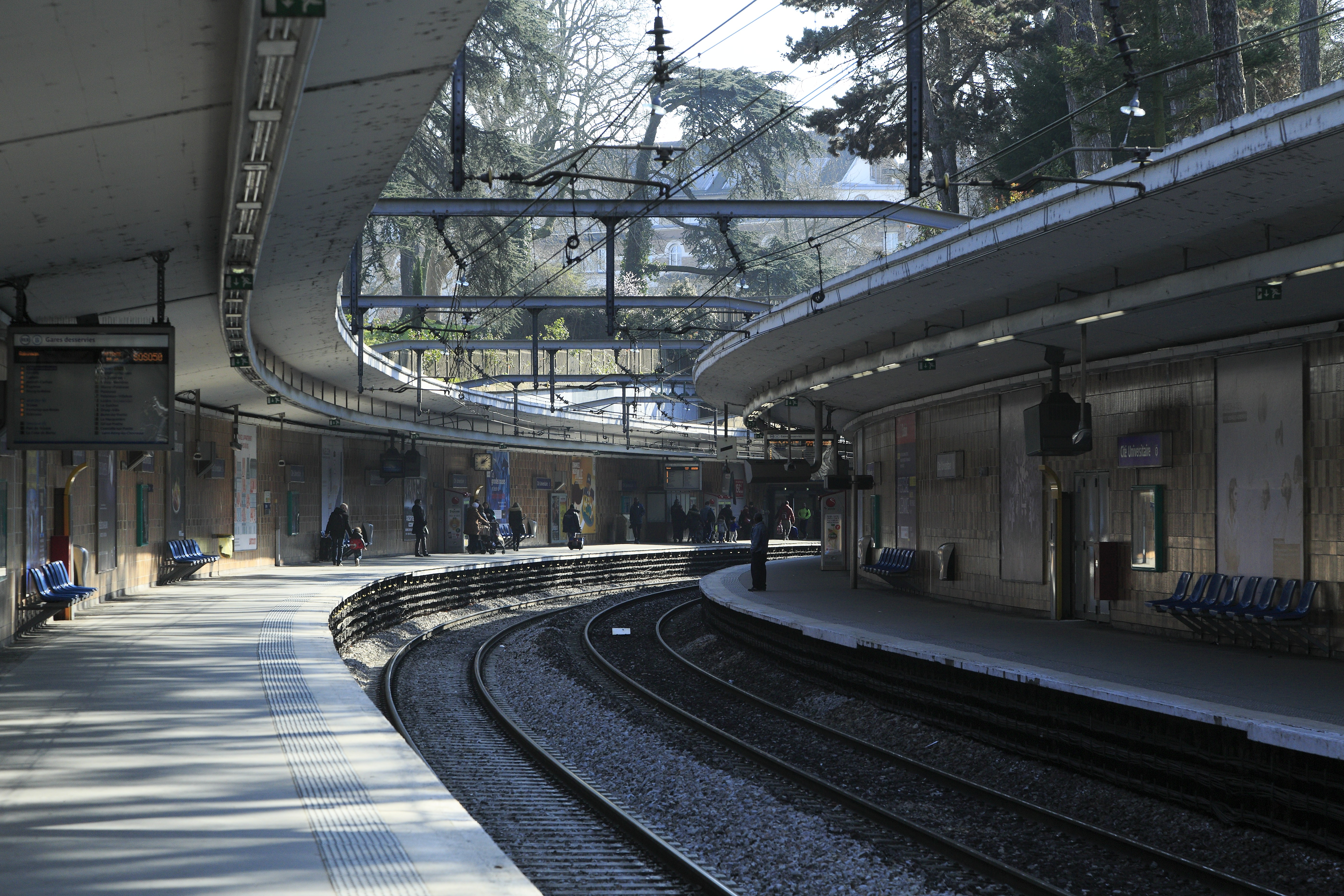
- Cité Universitaire station platforms

General information
- Location: Paris; France
- Coordinates: 48°49′16″N 2°20′20″E
- Operator: RATP Group
- Line: Ligne de Sceaux
- Platforms: 2 side platforms
- Tracks: 2
- Connections: RATP Bus: 21 67 216

Construction
- Structure type: Below-grade
- Accessible: Yes, by request to staff

Other information
- Station code: 87758649
- Fare zone: 1

History
- Opened: 7 June 1846

Passengers
- 2019: 7,365,818

Services
Preceding station	RER	Following station
Denfert-Rochereau towards Aéroport Charles de Gaulle 2 TGV or Mitry–Claye	RER B	Gentilly towards Robinson or Saint-Rémy-lès-Chevreuse
Location

Cité Universitaire station (French pronunciation: [site ynivɛʁsitɛːʁ]) is a station on RER B of Île-de-France's express suburban rail system, the Réseau Express Régional. It is situated in the 14th arrondissement of Paris. The station serves the Cité Internationale Universitaire de Paris (CIUP) and replaced a line on the Ligne de Sceaux called Sceaux-Ceinture, after the fact that it was a junction with the now-inoperable Ligne de Petite Ceinture

== Adjacent tram stop ==
- Cité Universitaire on Île-de-France tramway Line 3a

== See also ==
- List of stations of the Paris RER
