= Gentilly, Val-de-Marne =

Gentilly
- Commune
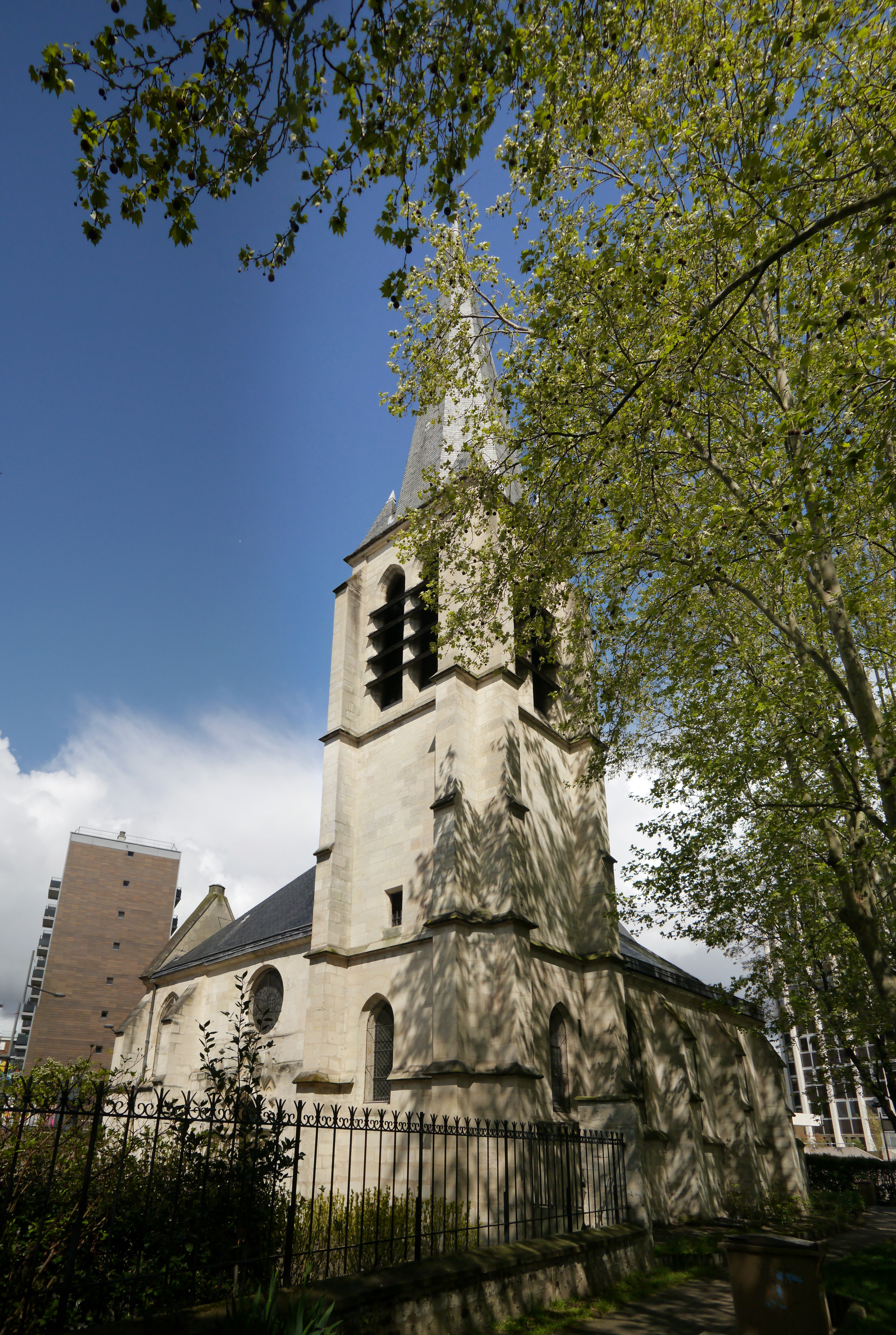
- The church of Saint-Saturnin, in Gentilly

- Coat of arms

- Location (in red) within Paris inner suburbs
- Location of Gentilly
- Location within France Location within Île-de-France (region)
- Coordinates: 48°48′48″N 2°20′40″E
- Country: France
- Region: Île-de-France
- Department: Val-de-Marne
- Arrondissement: L'Haÿ-les-Roses
- Canton: Le Kremlin-Bicêtre
- Intercommunality: Grand Paris

Government
  - Mayor (2026–32): Fatah Aggoune (PCF)
- Area^{1}: 1.18 km^{2} (0.46 sq mi)
- Population (2023): 19,963
  - Density: 16,900/km^{2} (43,800/sq mi)
- Time zone: UTC+01:00 (CET)
  - Summer (DST): UTC+02:00 (CEST)
- INSEE/Postal code: 94037 /94250
- ^{1} French Land Register data, which excludes lakes, ponds, glaciers > 1 km^{2} (0.386 sq mi or 247 acres) and river estuaries.

Gentilly (French pronunciation: [ʒɑ̃tiji]) is a commune in the southern suburbs of Paris, France. It is the closest commune to Paris, located 4.1 km (2.5 mi) from the city center.

== Name ==
The name Gentilly was recorded for the first time in the 6th century as Gentilly, a royal estate of some importance where coinage was minted. The etymology of the name seems to be "estate of Gentilius", a Gallo-Roman landowner. However, some other researchers think that the name is connected with Latin gentilis (meaning "gentile", "pagan", "foreigner") in reference to foreign goldsmiths who may have settled in Gentilly in the Early Middle Ages.

== History ==
On 1 January 1860, the city of Paris was enlarged by annexing neighboring communes. On that occasion, about half of the commune of Gentilly was annexed to Paris, and forms now the neighborhoods of Maison-Blanche and Glacière, in the 13th arrondissement of Paris.

On 13 December 1896, about half of the remaining territory of Gentilly was detached and became the commune of Le Kremlin-Bicêtre, leaving Gentilly with about a quarter of its pre-1860 area.

== Culture ==
The photographer Robert Doisneau was born in Gentilly (14 April 1912). There is a Maison de la photographie Robert Doisneau, an international cultural center for humanist photography.

== Places of worship ==
There are two churches in Gentilly: the church of Saint-Saturnin, and the church of Sacré-Cœur de Gentilly. Saint-Saturnin welcomes all Christians, whereas the Sacré-Cœur de Gentilly is mainly a community for Portuguese Catholics.

== Transport ==
Gentilly is served by Gentilly station on Paris RER line.

== Population ==
Historical population
Year	Pop.	±% p.a.
1968	18,812	—
1975	17,026	−1.41%
1982	16,732	−0.25%
1990	17,093	+0.27%
1999	16,118	−0.65%
2007	17,103	+0.74%
2012	16,623	−0.57%
2017	18,605	+2.28%
2023	19,963	+1.18%
Source: INSEE

== Education ==
Gentilly is served by:

- Four preschools: Jean Lurcat, Lamartine, Henri Barbusse, Victor Hugo, and Marie et Pierre Curie
- Four elementary schools: Lamartine, Henri Barbusse, Victor Hugo, and Gustave Courbet
- One junior high school: Collège Rosa Parks
- Two senior high schools:
  - Lycée professionnel du Val-de-Bièvre
  - Lycée intercommunal Darius Milhaud which is in Le Kremlin-Bicêtre

== Notable residents ==
- St. Eligius, also known as Éloi de Noyon or Saint Éloi (c. 588 - 1 December 660) is the patron saint of goldsmiths, metalworkers, coin collectors, horses, and those who work with them.
- Saint Martial, third-century monk and first bishop of Limoges.
- Pepin the Short (Pépin le Bref), eighth-century king of the Franks, son of Charles Martel, and father of Charlemagne.
- Blanche of Castile (1188–1252) is said to have owned a castle in Gentilly, the remains of which, chiefly underground vaults, still exist.
- Isaac de Benserade, author and playwright of the seventeenth century, lived in Gentilly and died there in 1691.
- Jacques Chapelle chemist and potter, director of the pottery works at Sceaux from 1748 to 1763, was born at Gentilly in 1721.
- Robert Doisneau, the photographer, was born at Gentilly in 1912.
- Sophie Marceau, the movie actress, born in 1966, lived in Gentilly.
- Raymond Gentilly.

== See also ==
- Communes of the Val-de-Marne department
- Georges Saupique. Église du Sacré-Coeur sculptor
