= Lycée intercommunal Darius-Milhaud =

Senior high school in France

Coordinates: 48.8026°N 2.3497°E

Lycée intercommunal Darius Milhaud is a senior high school in Le Kremlin-Bicêtre, France, in the Paris metropolitan area. It serves residents of the communes of Le Kremlin-Bicêtre, Arcueil, Gentilly, and Villejuif, in Val-de-Marne. It is named after the French composer Darius Milhaud.

Lycée Général Darius Milhaud and Lycée Professionnel Erik Satie were a part of a school complex in September 1976. The unified school was established in 1991 from the merger of Milhaud and Satie.
