= Joseph Cange =

French revolutionary (1753–?)

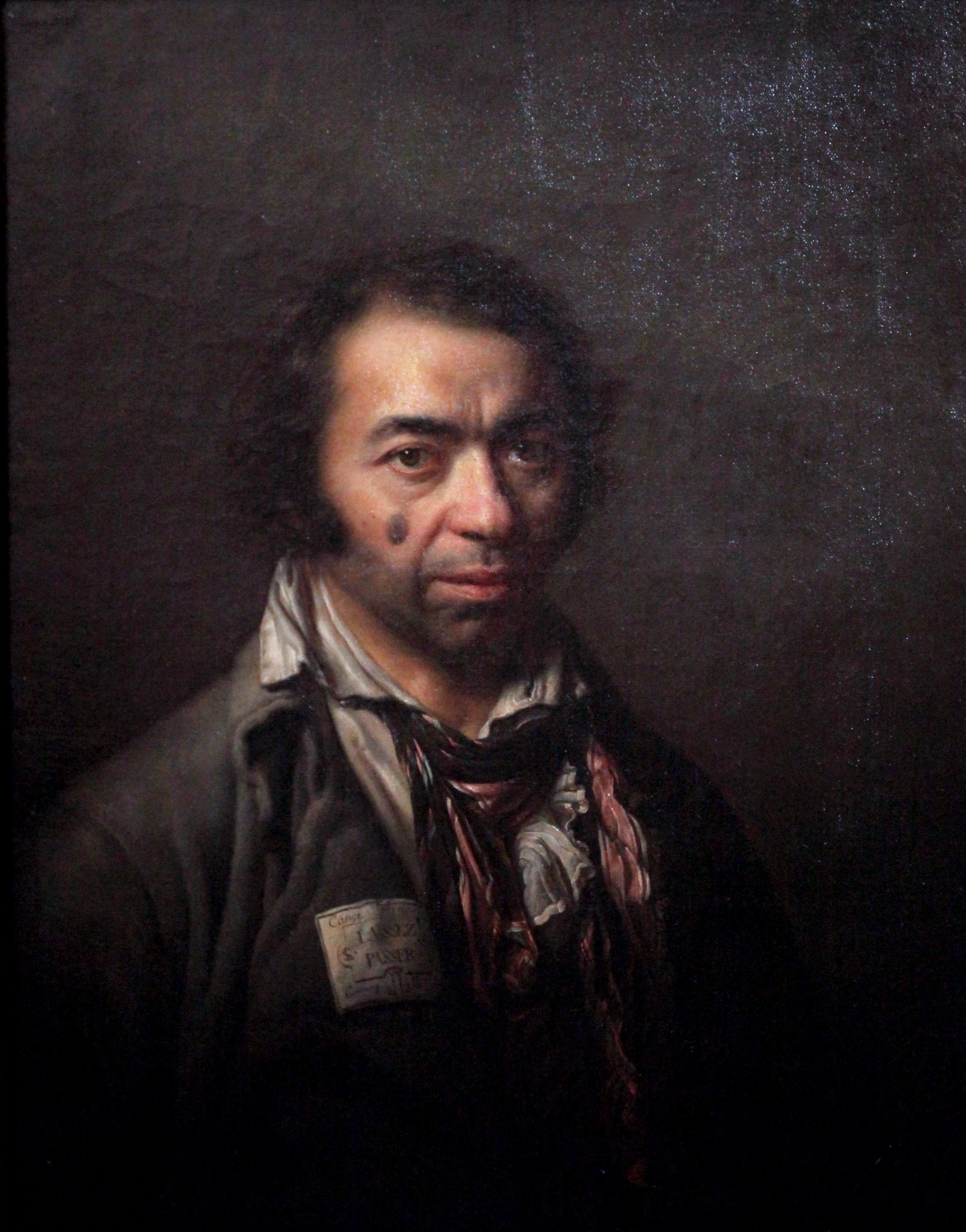
Joseph Cange, messenger of Saint-Lazare prison, by Pierre-Nicolas Legrand de Lérant, (Musée de la Révolution française).

Joseph Cange (born in Saarbourg, Germany; 19 September 1753 – ?) was a minor figure of the French Revolution.

Cange was born to the family of a peasant. He went on to serve as a clerk at Prison Saint-Lazare during the Reign of Terror.

One day, he was sent to the wife and children of a prisoner, Monsieur George; moved by their miserable condition, he shared his money with them, claiming that the funds were sent by the prisoner. George was freed at the Thermidorian Reaction and investigated to find the benefactor, eventually identifying Cange.

The story came public, written into a play by Michel-Jean Sedaine, and reported before the National Convention, where the President declared "We applaud to Cange's generosity. We like the virtue that characterises him".

Cange became a popular figure, having his portrait made by Pierre-Nicolas Legrand de Lérant and four theatre plays written after the story.

== Sources and references ==
- FDHUM 101 The Heroic Journey
