= Seret (Drohobych) =

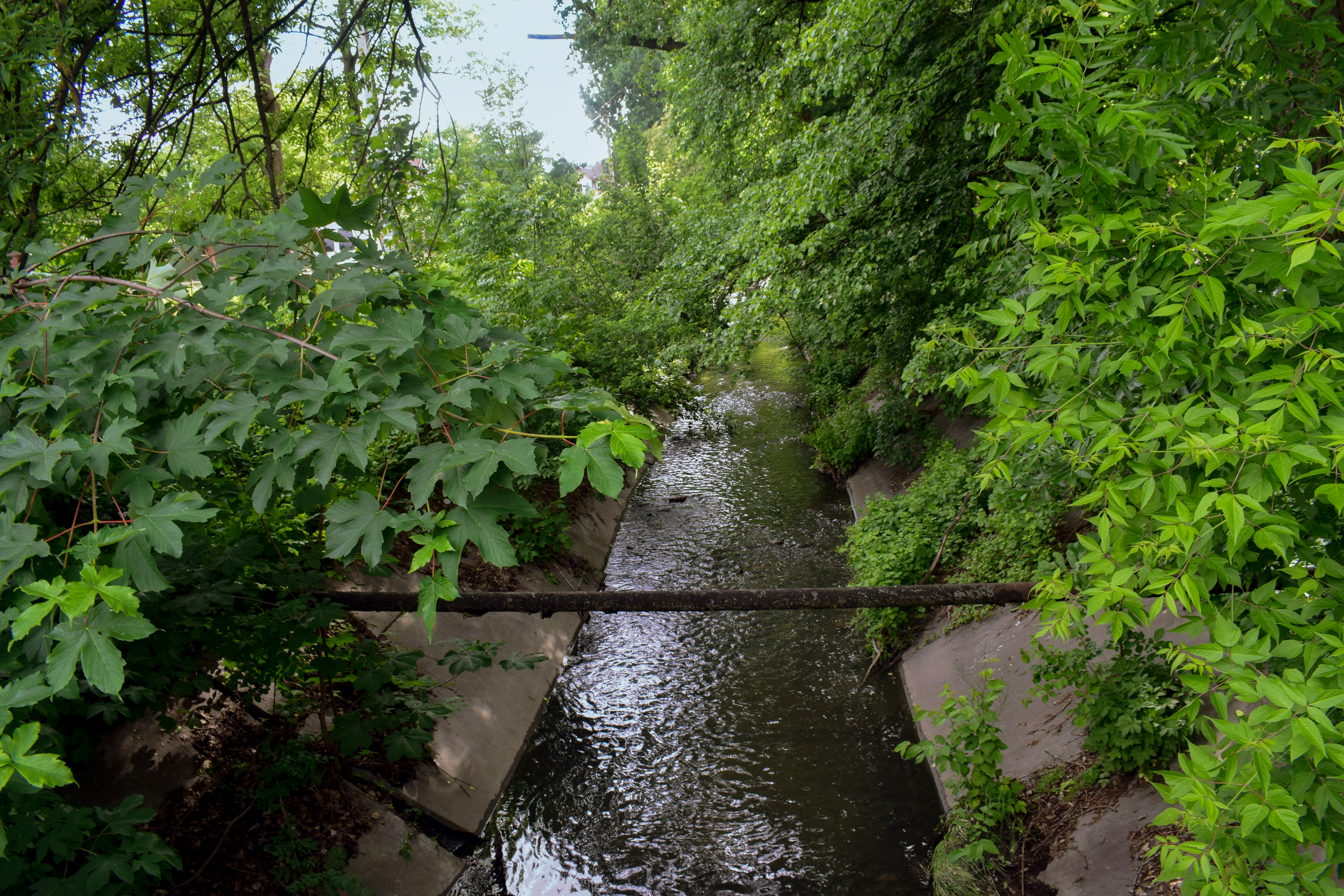
- Seret River, a tributary of Tysmenytsia
- Native name: Серет (Ukrainian)

Location
- City: Drohobych, Lviv Oblast, Ukraine

Physical characteristics
- Source
  - location: Drohobych
  - coordinates: 49°21′20″N 23°28′44″E
- Mouth: Tysmenytsia
  - coordinates: 49°20′48″N 23°32′23″E
- Length: 8 km (5.0 mi)

Basin features
- Progression: Dniester→ Dniester Estuary→ Black Sea

The Seret (Ukrainian: Серет) is a minor river in Ukraine, a tributary of the Tysmenytsia (Dniester basin). The Seret flows through the center of Drohobych, a city located in Lviv Oblast in the west of Ukraine.

The river flows from a lake in the forested Ivano-Frankivsk Oblast and is very polluted with a distinct smell. Of all species only microorganisms and domestic ducks can tolerate the water and the river's condition is currently a subject of the biological research.

The town's main park and the city hall are located along the river.
