= Thomas de Treil de Pardailhan =

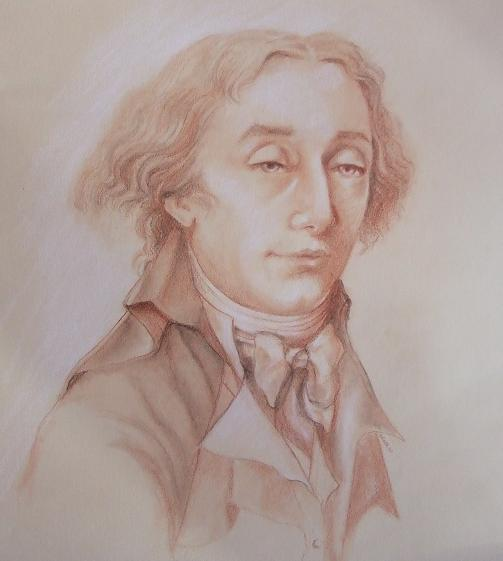
Thomas de Treil de Pardailhan

Thomas-François de Treil de Pardailhan (1754, Paris – 2 August 1822, Pardailhan) was the eldest of an ennobled Languedocien family, originating in the Saint-Pons-de-Thomières region. At first an officer in the Maison Militaire du Roi, baron Thomas de Treil de Pardailhan was Maître d'hôtel du Roi at the Court of Versailles at the end of the Ancien Régime. His writings, however, show him as an opponent of the privileges of aristocracy and in favor of the new ideas. The French Revolution marks a rupture with his milieu: in support of deep social reform, he was elected député for Paris in 1791 to the Legislative Assembly, but always remained attached to the idea of a constitutional monarchy and was imprisoned as a suspect during the Reign of Terror. Ruined by bad business dealings under the Directory and by sources of income he had lost in the Revolution, he ended his life at his château at Pardailhan in 1822.

== Life ==
From his earliest youth Thomas de Treil de Pardailhan embarked on a military career, being made a gendarme de la garde du roi aged 10, then a musketeer, and finally becoming an ensign in the Swiss Guards of Monsieur frère du roi, with the rank of lieutenant-colonel. After 20 years of service, he was made a knight of the Order of Saint Louis.

After his 1782 marriage to Charlotte Gautier de Vinfrais, he became seigneur of Pardailhan (Hérault) and took the title baron de Pardailhan.

In 1785, he served Louis XVI at Versailles in the essentially honorific role of Conseiller Maître d'hôtel du roi. In 1787 France was facing severe financial difficulties. The King had to cut his expenditures as a national bankruptcy threatened, tax reforms were enforced and the gendarme de la garde was dissolved.

As early as the first events of 1789 Thomas-François engaged with passion in political life – he was made a delegate in March that year by the representatives of the Three Estates of Saint-Pons, to support the writing of a constitution.

In 1790, he was elector of the canton of Villejuif, and in 1791 the administrator of the département of Paris (conseiller général). In September 1791, he was elected to be the député for the département of Paris in the Legislative Assembly, and got himself known for legal propositions on the organisation of France's armies (especially a proposition condemning émigré officers to death). He is known to have proposed the creation of a military decoration to the Legislative Assembly, and this is taken as the precedent for the Legion of Honour. Treil-Pardailhan was the member of the diplomatic committee, implicated in triggering war with the European powers

In 1794, during the Terror, he was imprisoned as a moderate in the prison Saint-Lazare in Paris, only just escaping the guillotine, when he was questioned about conspiracy in the prisons.

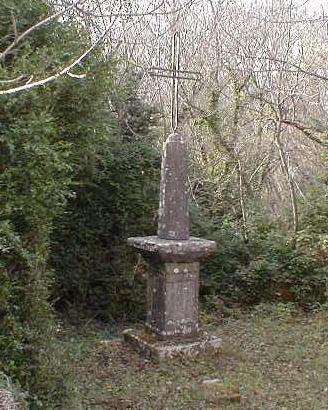
His tomb

Under the Directory, he founded a company charged with provisioning the armies of the Republic. This and other hazardous investments put him in a more and more difficult financial situation. In 1800, ruined, he rallied to Napoleon's new regime but, pursued by his creditors, in 1806 he went into self-imposed exile in Milan in Italy, from where he learnt of the expropriation of domaine of Pardailhan by his own brother Alexandre. Returning to France, he definitively installed himself at the château at Pardailhan, repurchased by his wife Charlotte.

On the Bourbon Restoration in 1815 he was named mayor of the commune of Pardailhan. He died on 2 August 1822 at the château de Pardailhan, and the commune still holds his tomb, in a state of disrepair.

== Discourse and opinions ==
- Discours de M. Treilh-Pardailhan, député de Paris, sur les récompenses militaires, du 31 mai 1792 (printed text – Assemblée Nationale)
- Question proposée par T.-F. Treil-Pardailhan,... Le titre de membre d'une association particulière est-il compatible avec celui de législateur ? (printed text – Assemblée Nationale)
- T.-F. Treil, député de Paris, à ses collègues, le 9 juillet 1792 (printed text – Assemblée Nationale)
- Lettres de plusieurs députés [Descrots d'Estrées, Nicolas Beaupuis, Treil-Pardailhan,] qui font hommage à l'Assemblée nationale de leurs décorations militaires. Imprimés par ordre de l'Assemblée nationale...

== Bibliography ==
- (in French) Nobiliaire universel de France ou Recueil général des généalogies historiques – Johann Lanz, Nicolas Viton de Saint-Allais, Ducas, Lespines, de Saint-Pons (1875)
- (in French) Catalogue général et alphabétique des familles nobles de France admises dans l'ordre de Malte – de Saint-Allais (1872)
- (in French) Dictionnaire de la Révolution et de l'Empire – Dr Robinet
- (in French) Familles nobles et bourgeoises de Saint-Pons – Joseph Sahuc (Bulletin de la Société Archéologique de Béziers 1907)
- (in French) Dictionnaire de biographie héraultaise – Pierre Clerc (2006)
- (in French) Un Saint-Ponais député de Paris à l'Assemblée Législative, Th.-F. de Treil de Pardailhan – Dr V. Joecker (Bulletin de la Société Archéologique de Béziers 2001)
