= Bystrytsia Tysmenytska =

River in western Ukraine

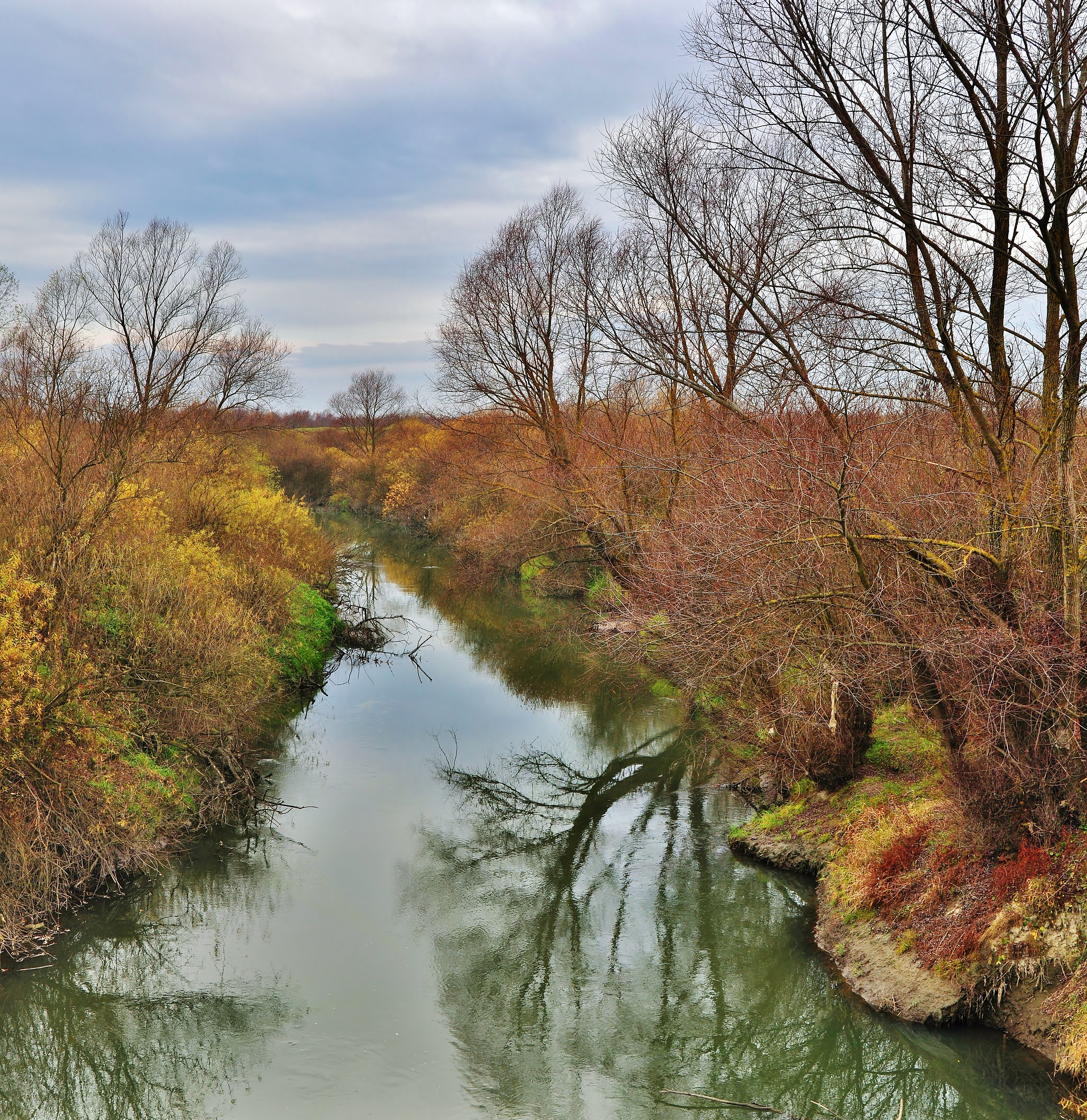
- The river near its mouth
- Native name: Бистриця Тисменицька

Location
- Region: Lviv Oblast, Ukraine

Physical characteristics
- Source
  - location: near Bystrytsia
  - coordinates: 49°14′52″N 23°14′06″E
- Mouth: Dniester
  - coordinates: 49°30′18″N 23°45′54″E
- Length: 73 km (45 mi)
- Basin size: 1,160 km^{2} (450 sq mi)

Basin features
- Progression: Dniester→ Dniester Estuary→ Black Sea

The Bystrytsia Tysmenytska (Ukrainian: Бистриця Тисменицька) is a river in western Ukraine, and is a part of the Dniester basin. The river is a right tributary of the Dniester, and flows through parts of Lviv Oblast.

The river has a total length of 73 kilometres (45 mi), and a basin size of 1,160 square kilometres (450 sq mi).
