= Gilles-Paul Cauvet =

French sculptor

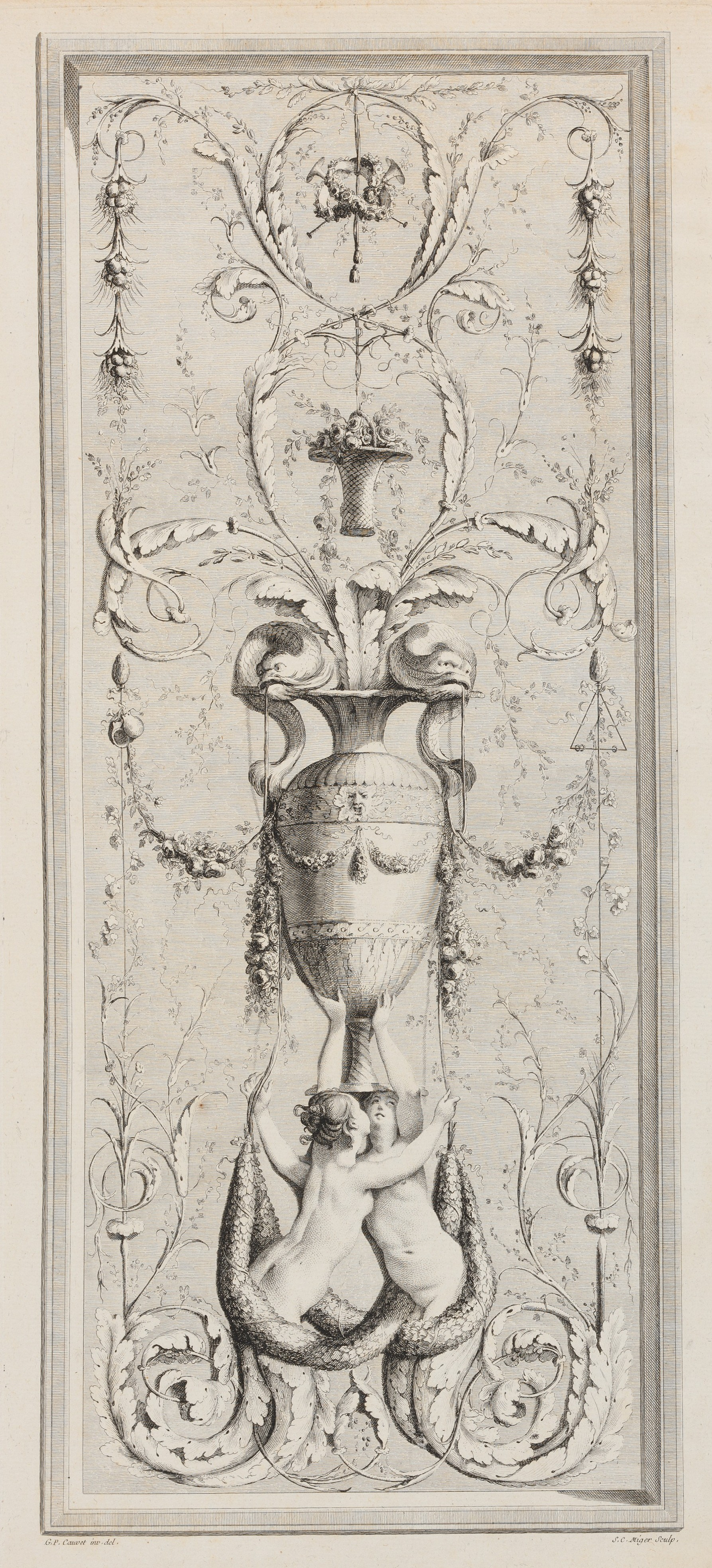

Gilles-Paul Cauvet (1731-15 November 1788) was a French ornamental sculptor and cabinet-maker. Born in Aix-en-Provence, he took part in the furnishing of the Palais-Royal in Paris and designed furniture in Louis XVI style.

== Bibliography ==
- http://www.larousse.fr/encyclopedie/personnage/Cauvet/112182
