= Saint-Lazare Prison =

French prison

Coordinates: 48°52′32″N 2°21′16″E

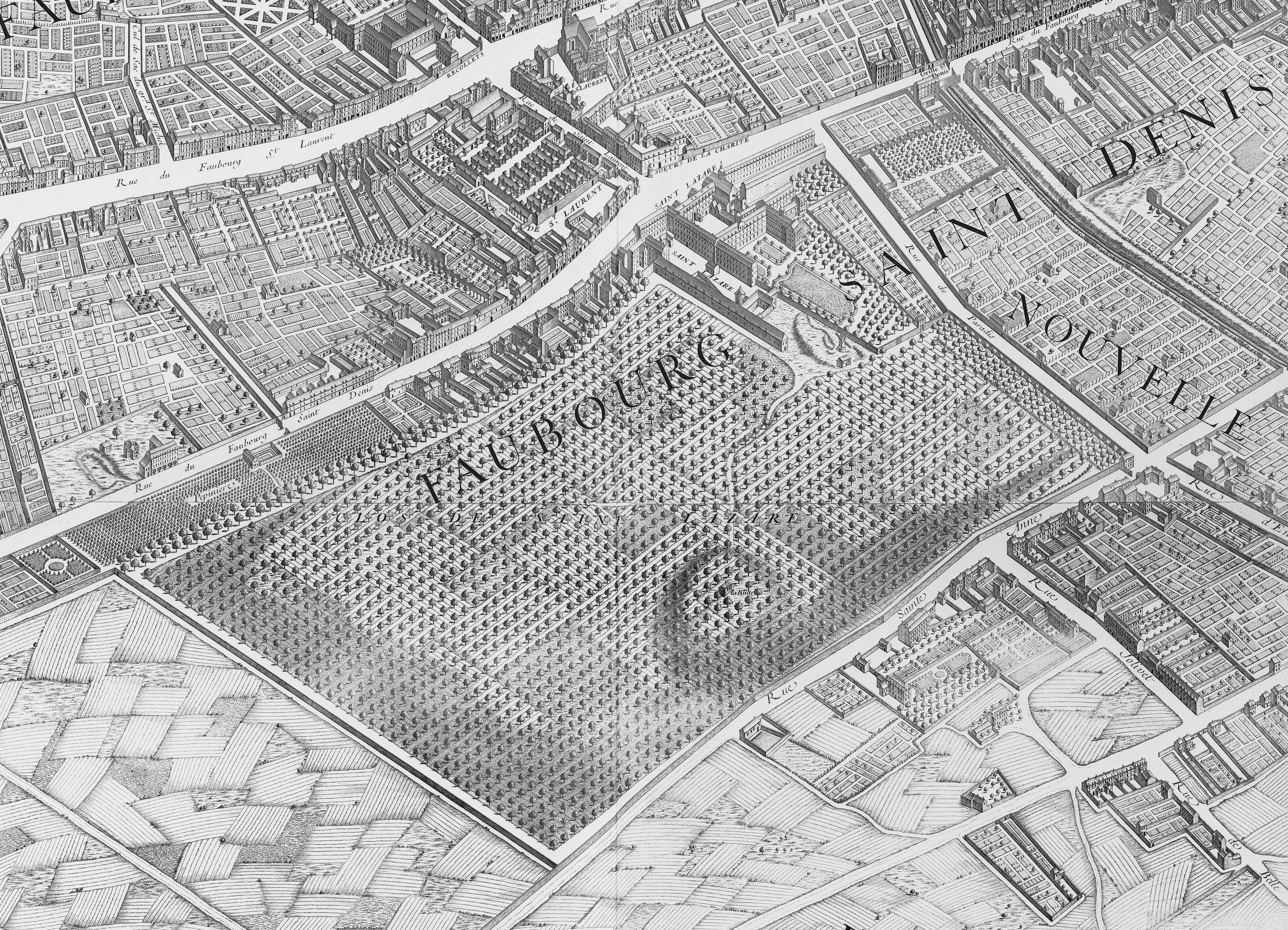
The enclos Saint-Lazare on Turgot's 1739 map of Paris

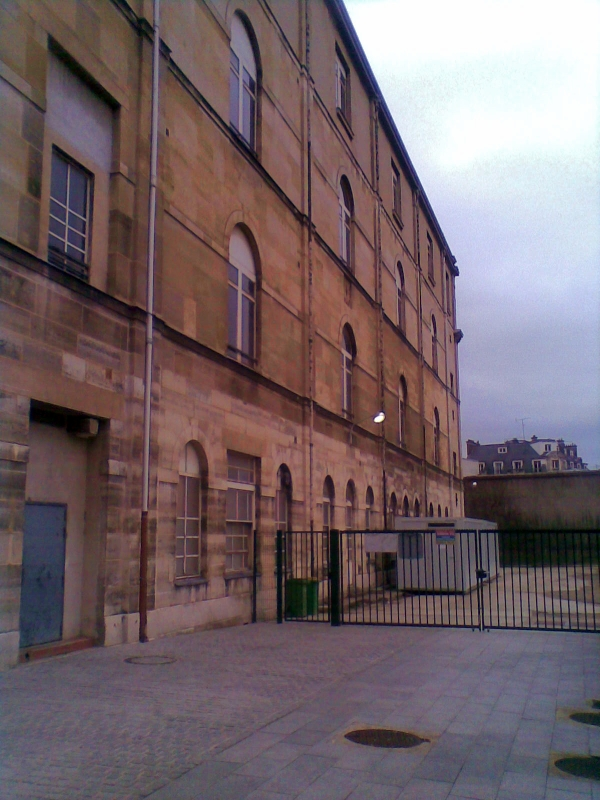
The building in 2010

Saint-Lazare Prison was a prison in the 10th arrondissement of Paris, France. It existed from 1793 until 1935 and was housed in a former motherhouse of the Vincentians.

== History ==
in the 12th century a leprosarium was founded on the road from Paris to Saint-Denis at the boundary of a marshy area near River Seine. It was ceded on 7 January 1632 to St. Vincent de Paul and the Congregation of the Mission he had founded. At this stage, in addition to being a headquarter for the congregation, it became a place of detention for people who had become an embarrassment to their families: an enclosure for "black sheep" who had brought disgrace to their relatives.

The prison was situated in the enclos Saint-Lazare, the largest enclosure in Paris until the end of the 18th century, between the Rue de Paradis to its south, the Rue du Faubourg-Saint-Denis to its east, the Boulevard de la Chapelle to its north and the Rue Sainte-Anne to its west (today the Rue du Faubourg Poissonnière). Its site is now marked by the Church of Saint-Vincent-de-Paul.

The building was converted to prison at the time of the Reign of Terror in 1793, then a women's prison in the early 19th century, its land having been seized and re-allotted little by little since the Revolution. It was largely demolished in 1935, with the Assistance publique - Hôpitaux de Paris installing itself in the remaining buildings, where they remained until recently. Only the prison infirmary and chapel (built by Louis-Pierre Baltard in 1834) remain of the prison, with the latter to be seen in the square Alban-Satragne (107, rue du Faubourg-Saint-Denis) in the 10th arrondissement. The surviving remains of the Saint-Lazare prison were inscribed on the supplementary inventory of historic monuments in November 2005.

The Musée de la Révolution française conserves a portrait of Joseph Cange, a prison officer at the Saint-Lazare prison during the reign of Terror, who gave financial help to the family of a prisoner at the risk of his life and that was honoured nationally after the fall of Robespierre.

A song by Aristide Bruant entitled "À Saint-Lazare" is named after the prison.

== Famous prisoners ==
=== Pre-Revolution ===
- Pierre de Beaumarchais, playwright
- Henri de Saint-Simon, French social theorist and one of the chief founders of Christian socialism

=== During the Revolution ===
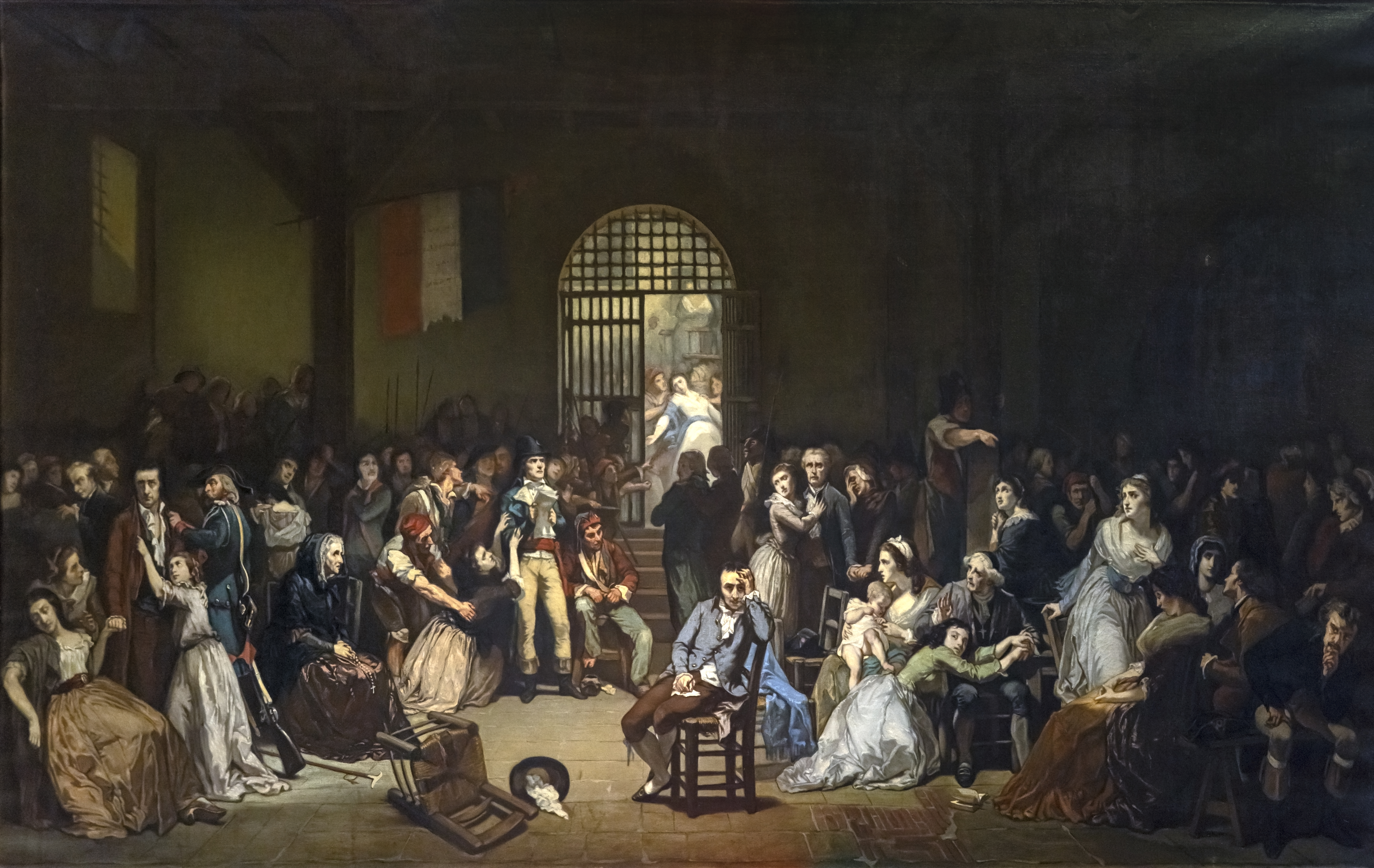
Calling out the last victims of the terror at Saint-Lazare Prison, July 1794

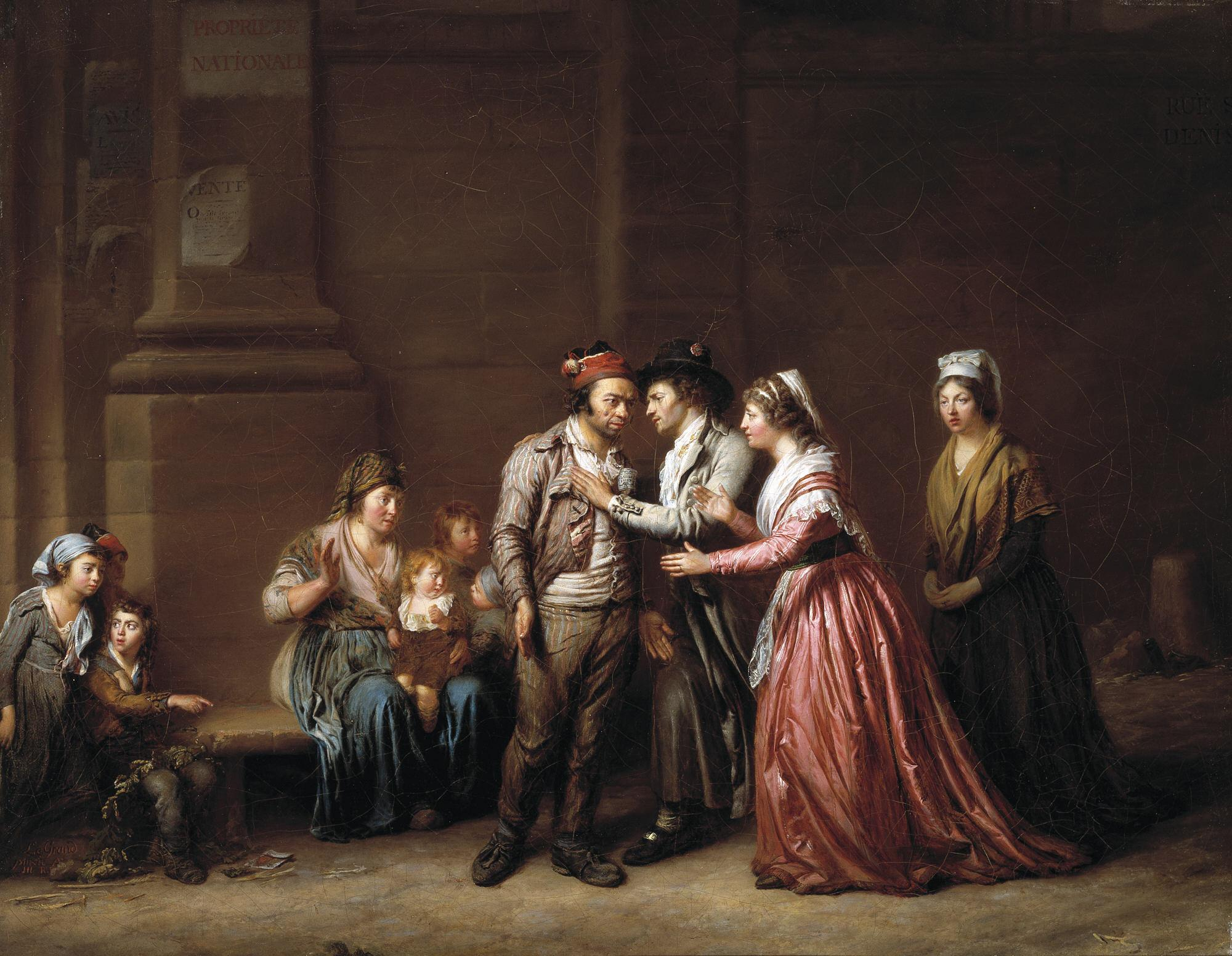
Joseph Cange, messenger of Saint-Lazare prison

- François-Joseph Bélanger, architect
- Adèle de Bellegarde, salonnière and model for Jacques-Louis David
- André Chénier, poet
- Aimée de Coigny (1769–1820), known as la Jeune Captive from her elegy by André Chénier
- Marquis de Sade, writer and libertine
- Hubert Robert, painter
- Jean-Antoine Roucher, receveur des gabelles, poet, portrayed several times by Hubert Robert
- Joseph-Benoît Suvée, painter
- Thomas de Treil de Pardailhan, former baron and député for Paris in the Legislative Assembly
- Charles-Louis Trudaine, adviser to the Parlement
- Marie-Louise de Laval-Montmorency, abbess of Montmartre Abbey

=== Post-Revolution ===
- Léonie Biard, Victor Hugo's mistress
- Mata Hari, spy
- Louise Michel, communard

Sources

- Jacques Hillairet, Gibets, Piloris et Cachots du vieux Paris, éditions de Minuit, Paris, 1956 (ISBN 2707312754).
- (in French) Appel des dernières victimes de la terreur à la prison Saint-Lazare à Paris les 7-9 Thermidor an II by Charles-Louis Muller (1815–1892), painting held at the Musée national du château de Versailles.
