= Church of Saint-Cyr-Sainte-Julitte, Villejuif =

Roman Catholic church in Val-de-Marne, France

Church of Saint-Cyr-Sainte-Julitte
- French: Église Saint-Cyr-Sainte-Julitte de Villejuif
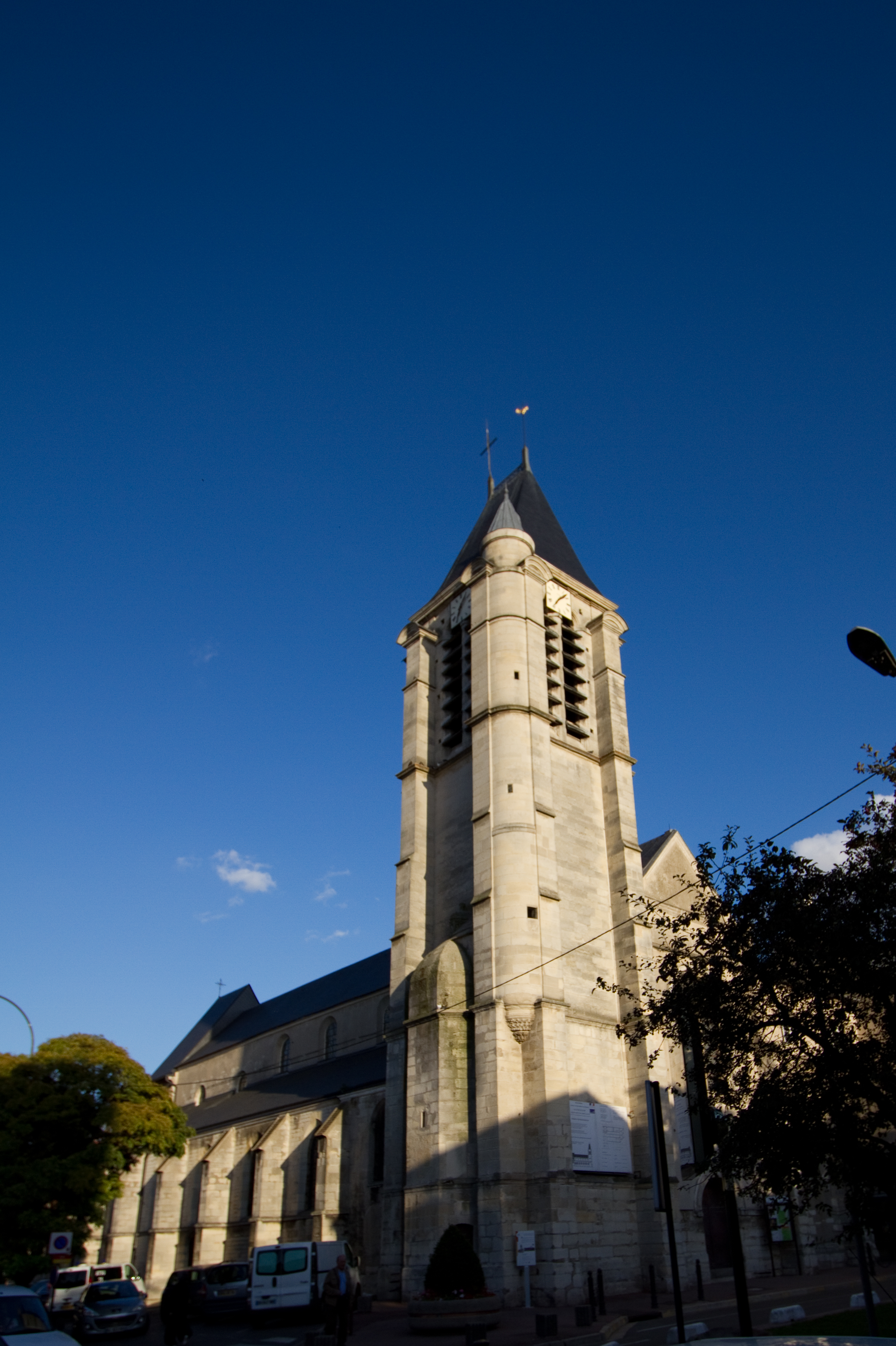

- Location within Paris and the inner ring
- 48°47′32″N 2°21′49″E
- Location: Villejuif, Val-de-Marne
- Country: France
- Denomination: Roman Catholic

History
- Status: Church
- Dedication: Cyricus and Julitta

Architecture
- Functional status: Active
- Architectural type: Church

Administration
- Diocese: Créteil

Monument historique
- Official name: Eglise Saint-Cyr-Sainte-Julitte
- Criteria: Inscrit MH
- Designated: October 19, 1928
- Reference no.: PA00079914

The Church of Saint-Cyr-Sainte-Julitte (French: église Saint-Cyr-Sainte-Julitte) is a Roman Catholic church located in Villejuif, Val-de-Marne, France. It is listed as a Historic Monument.

== Location ==
The church is located on the town hall square. It is adjacent to the town hall.

== History ==
The church was dedicated to Saint Cyricus and his mother Saint Julitta, two martyrs of the 4th century. The church was founded in the 13th century and was completely renovated with dimension stone and rubbles in 1535. The bell tower has the inscription "Memento mori 1549". In 1870, the church was occupied by the Communards.

The church was listed as a Historic Monument in 1928. The organ, made by manufacturers Hippolyte Loret and Gabriel Cavaillé-Coll, is a listed monument since 1991. The stained glass windows were made by Louis-Charles-Marie Champigneulle. The bell tower was restored from 1981 to 1988.

On April 19, 2015, a student, Sid Ahmed Ghlam, was arrested following a murder and was found to have been planning a shooting in the churches of Saint-Cyr-et-Sainte-Julitte and of St. Theresa during a Sunday Mass. According to the priest of Saint-Cyr-Sainte-Julitte, the arrest prevented a massacre, since 300 hundred people were present in the church on that day. Villejuif had already been targeted by Islamist terrorist Amedy Coulibaly during the January 2015 attacks.

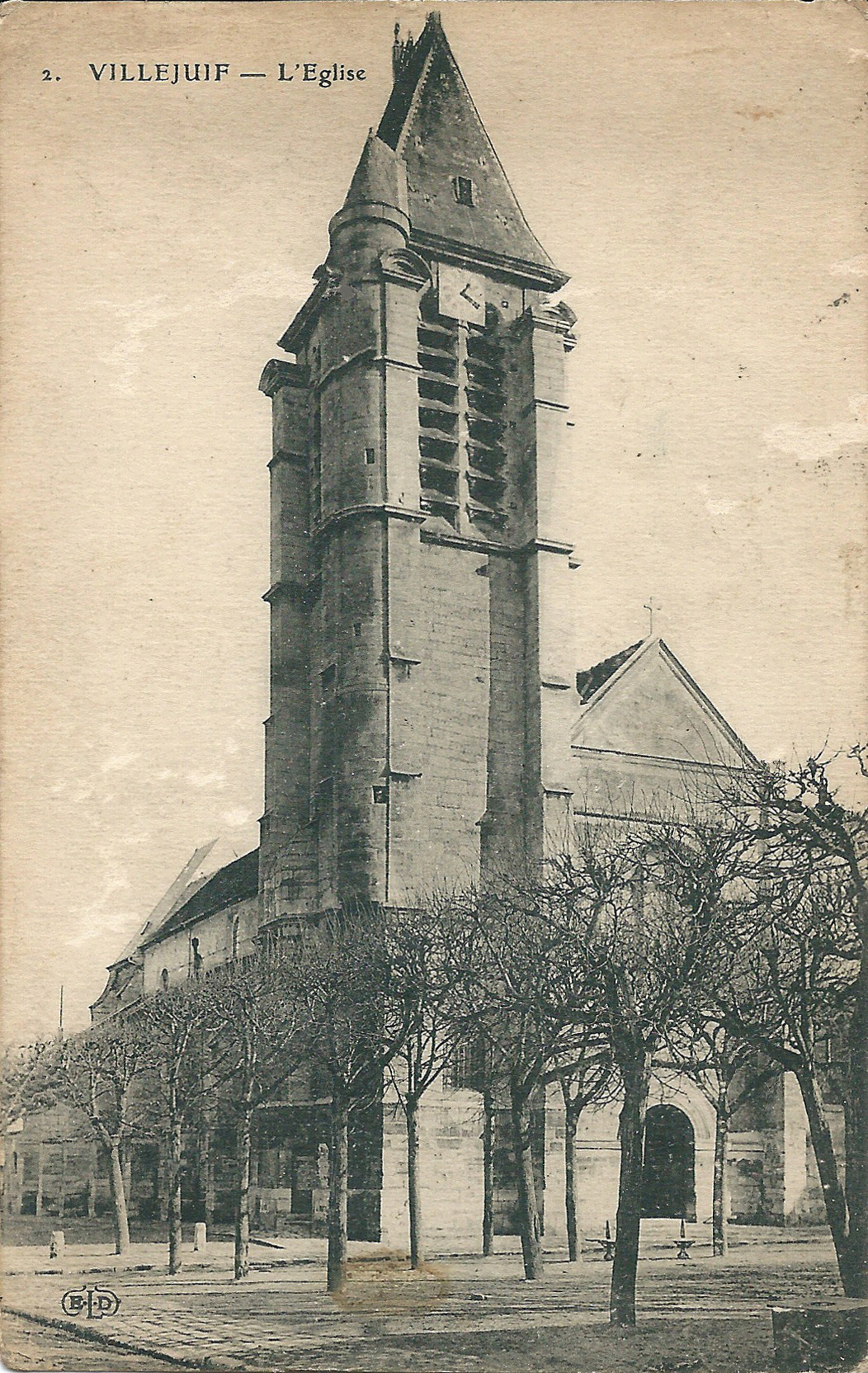
The church around 1926

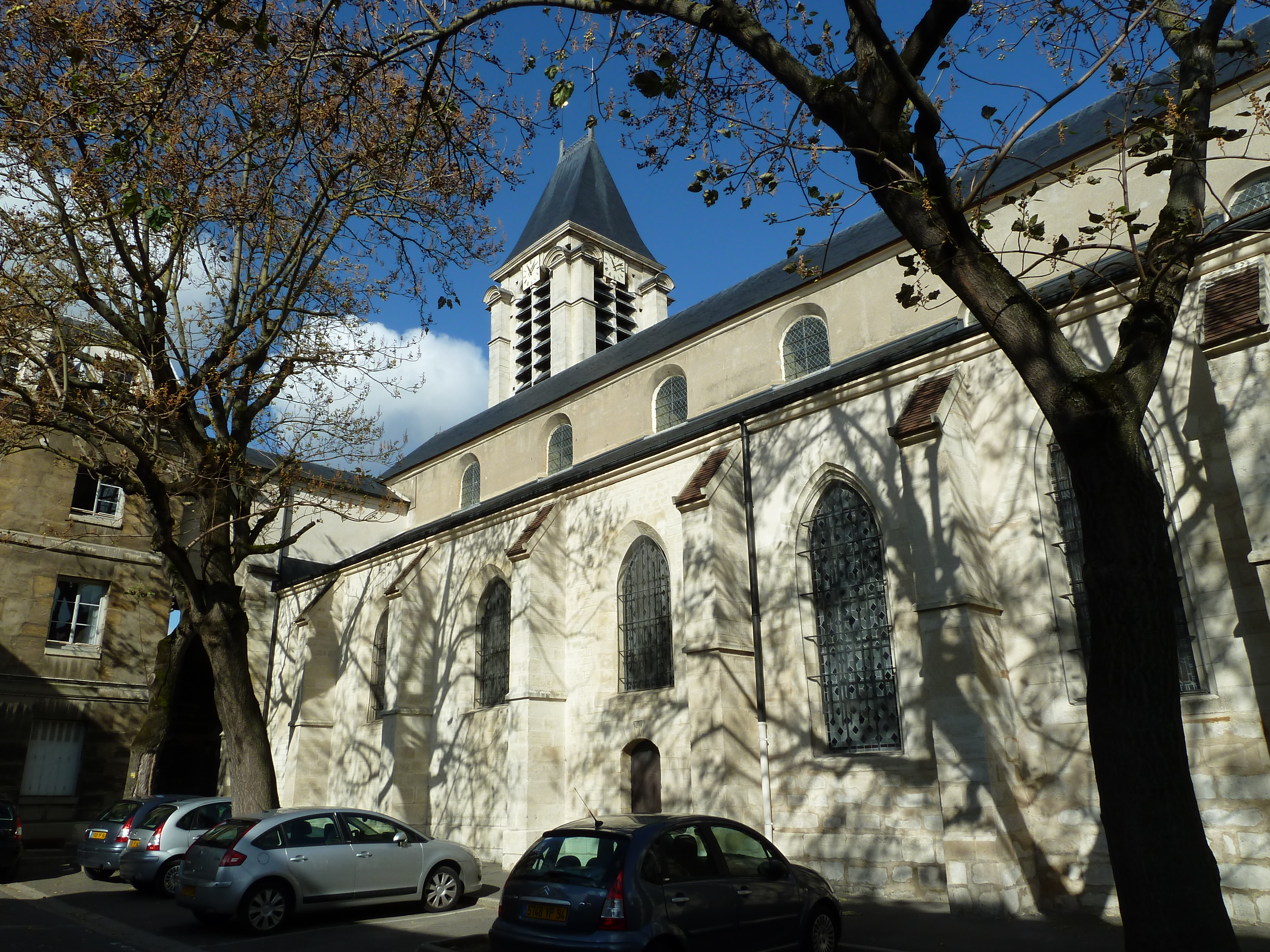
Side of the church

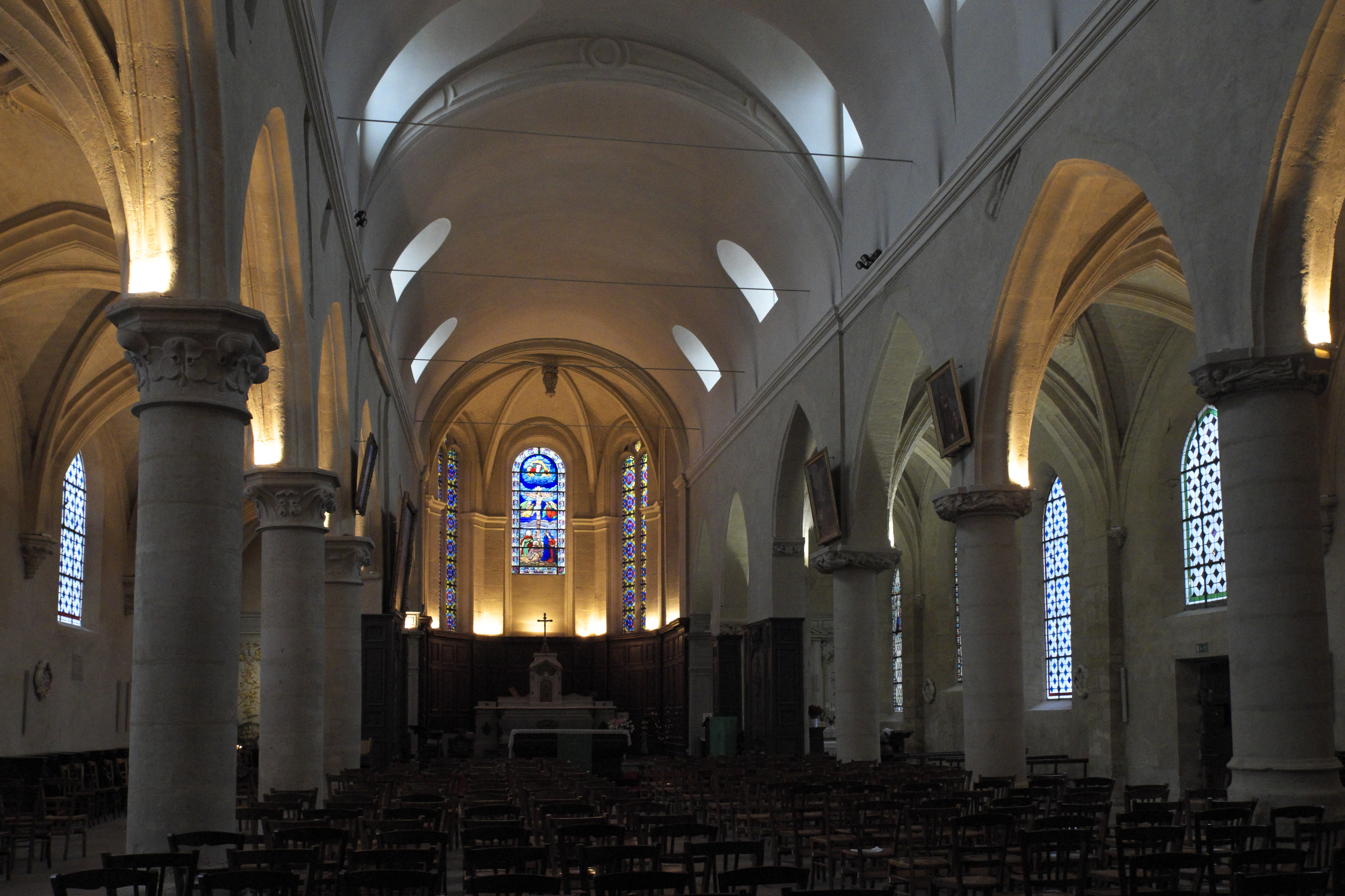
Interior

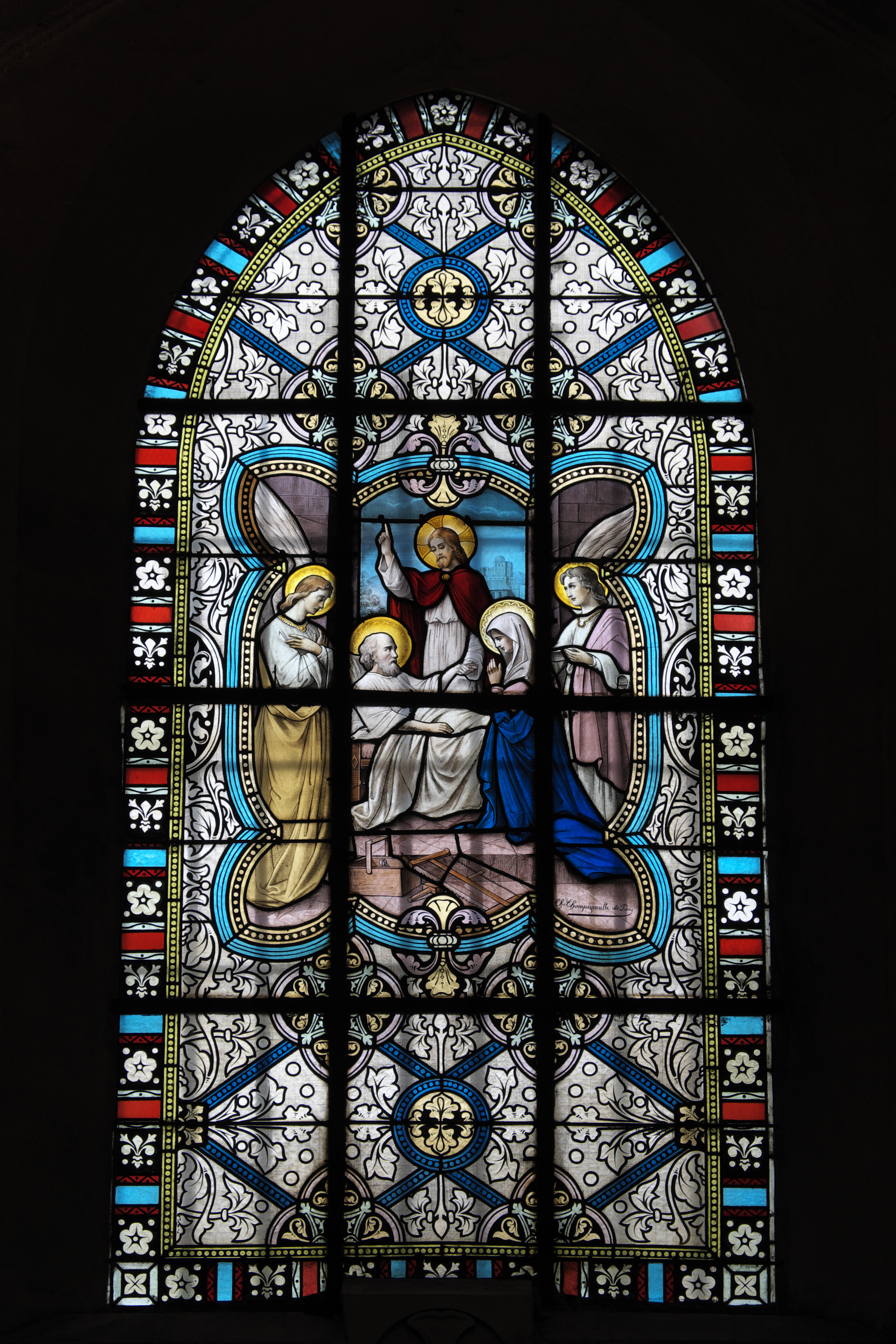
One of the stained glass windows

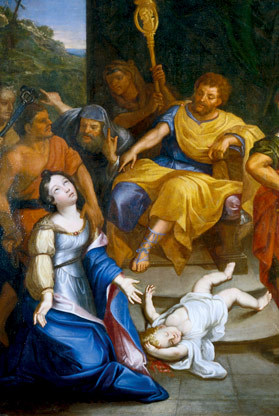
The martyrdom of Saint Julitta and Saint Cyricus

== Bibliography ==
- Escoda, Carlos (1999). L'église de Villejuif : Saint-Cyr-Sainte-Julitte. Histoire et découvertes (in French). Association pour la Sauvegarder et la Rénovation de l'Orgue et de l'Église de Villejuif (ASROE).
