= Adolphe Siret =

Belgian historian and writer (1818–1888)

Adolphe Siret (July 15, 1818 – January 6, 1888) was a Belgian historian, biographer, essayist, poet, biographer, writer and man of letters.

== Works ==
=== Bibliographies of painters ===
- Adolphe Siret, Dictionnaire historique des peintres de toutes les écoles depuis les temps les plus reculés jusqu'à nos jours, Bruxelles, Librairie encyclopédique de Périchon, 1848
- Adolphe Siret, Dictionnaire historique des peintres de toutes les écoles depuis l'origine de la peinture jusqu'à nos jours, Paris, A. Lacroix et Cie, 1874, 1155 p.
- Adolphe Siret, Dictionnaire historique et raisonné des peintres de toutes les écoles depuis l'origine de la peinture jusqu'à nos jours, vol. 1, Chez les Principaux Libraires, 1883, 568 p.
- Adolphe Siret, Dictionnaire historique et raisonné des peintres de toutes les écoles depuis l'origine de la peinture jusqu'à nos jours, t. 1, Berlin, Joseph Altmann, 1924

=== Other ===
- Adolphe Siret, Raphaël et Rubens et les peintres de leur école, Gand, De Busscher Frères, 1849
- Adolphe Siret, Louise d'Orléans Première reine des Belges : poème couronné par l'Académie royale des sciences, des lettres et des beaux-arts de Belgique, dans la séance publique du 8 mai 1851, 1851, 16 p.
- Adolphe Siret, La gravure en Belgique, Hebbelynck, 1852
- Adolphe Siret, Notes d'un amateur sur quelques tableaux du musée de peinture de Bruxelles, Hebbelynck, 1852
- Adolphe Siret, Récits historiques belges, Bruxelles, H Tarlier, 1855, 402 p.
- (nl) Adolphe Siret, Mijn oom de tooveraar : verhalen der provincie Luik, Rogghé, 1864, 12 p.
- (nl) Adolphe Siret, De drie gildebroêrs, 1864, 12 p.
- (nl) Adolphe Siret, Avondverhalen aan den haard: provincie Henegouwen, 1864, 111 p.
- Adolphe Siret, Erin Corr, membre de la classe des beaux-arts de l'académie royale de belgique. Notice, Hayez, 1865, 12 p.
- (nl) Adolphe Siret, De legendenverteller: verhalen der provincien Limburg en Luxemburg, Rogghé, 1868, 86 p.
- (nl) Adolphe Siret, Het land van Waas : tweede aflevering, Edom, 1868
- (nl) Adolphe Siret, De historische twist: verhalen der provincie West-Vlaanderen, Rogghé, 1868, 95 p.
- (nl) Adolphe Siret, De kunstgalerij: verhalen der provincie Antwerpen, Rogghé, 1868, 12 p.
- (nl) Adolphe Siret, De negen provincien van België: historische verhalen, Rogghé, 1868, 443 p.
- (nl) Adolphe Siret, Het familiehandschrift: verhalen der provincie Braband, Rogghé, 1868, 95 p.
- (nl) Adolphe Siret, De vakantien (brieven van een student): verhalen der provincie Namen, Rogghé, 1868, 12 p.
- Adolphe Siret, Notice sur Joseph-Ernest Buschmann, correspondant de l'Académie, Hayez, 1870, 12 p.
- (nl) Adolphe Siret, Frederic van de Kerkhove : landschapschilder, Drukkerij Popp, 1874
- Adolphe Siret, L'Enfant de Bruges [Frédéric Van de Kerckhove], renseignements biographiques, documents, articles de journaux, lettres ..., A. Lévy, 1876, 418 p
