= Villejuif =

- Commune
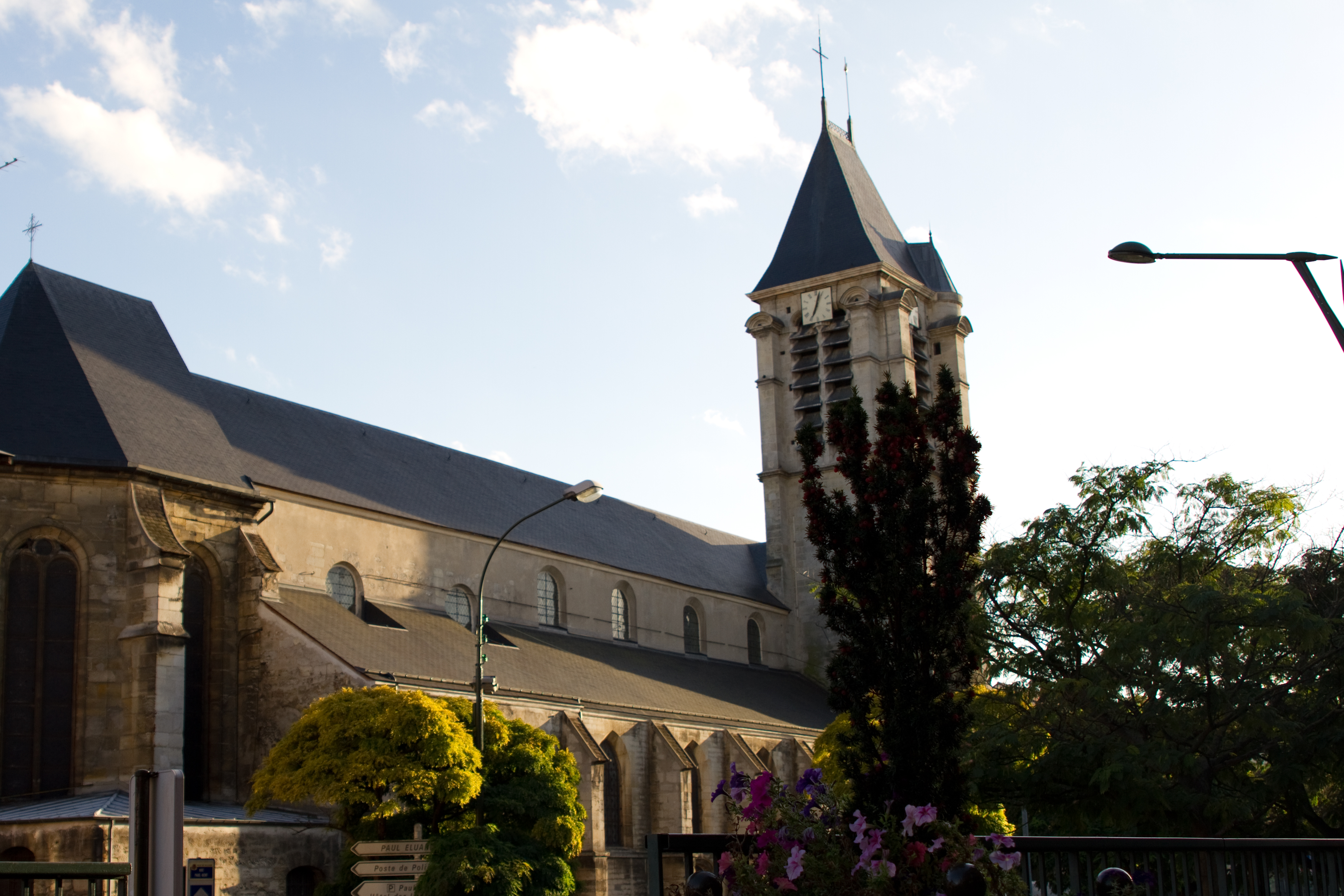
- The church of Saint-Cyr – Sainte-Julitte

- Coat of arms

- Location (in red) within Paris inner suburbs
- Location of Villejuif
- Location within France Location within Île-de-France (region)
- Coordinates: 48°47′31″N 2°21′49″E
- Country: France
- Region: Île-de-France
- Department: Val-de-Marne
- Arrondissement: L'Haÿ-les-Roses
- Canton: Villejuif
- Intercommunality: Grand Paris

Government
  - Mayor (2026–32): Pierre Garzon (PCF)
- Area^{1}: 5.34 km^{2} (2.06 sq mi)
- Highest elevation: 130 m (430 ft)
- Lowest elevation: 62 m (203 ft)
- Population (2023): 60,183
  - Density: 11,300/km^{2} (29,200/sq mi)
- Time zone: UTC+01:00 (CET)
  - Summer (DST): UTC+02:00 (CEST)
- INSEE/Postal code: 94076 /94800
- ^{1} French Land Register data, which excludes lakes, ponds, glaciers > 1 km^{2} (0.386 sq mi or 247 acres) and river estuaries.

Villejuif (French pronunciation: [vilʒɥif]) is a commune in the southern suburbs of Paris, France. It is located seven kilometres (4 1/2 miles) from the centre of Paris.

== Name ==
The earliest reference to Villejuif appears in a bill signed by the Pope Callixtus II on 27 November 1119. It refers to Villa Judea, the Latinized version of an Old French term meaning 'Jewish settlement'. During the following centuries, the toponym appears as Villejuifve, that is, following the archaic French spelling of the expression with the same meaning, cognate to modern French Villejuive. The 17th-century French author Louis Moréri suggested that the settlement was founded by Jews expelled from Paris. This idea, however, remains speculative as no surviving medieval Christian or Jewish sources mention the existence of a Jewish community here. An alternative explanation is that the name is a corruption of some earlier, similar-sounding name. Another suggestion made by historan Cecil Roth in 1951 is that names such as this simply reflect "an ancient building of unknown origin".

== History ==
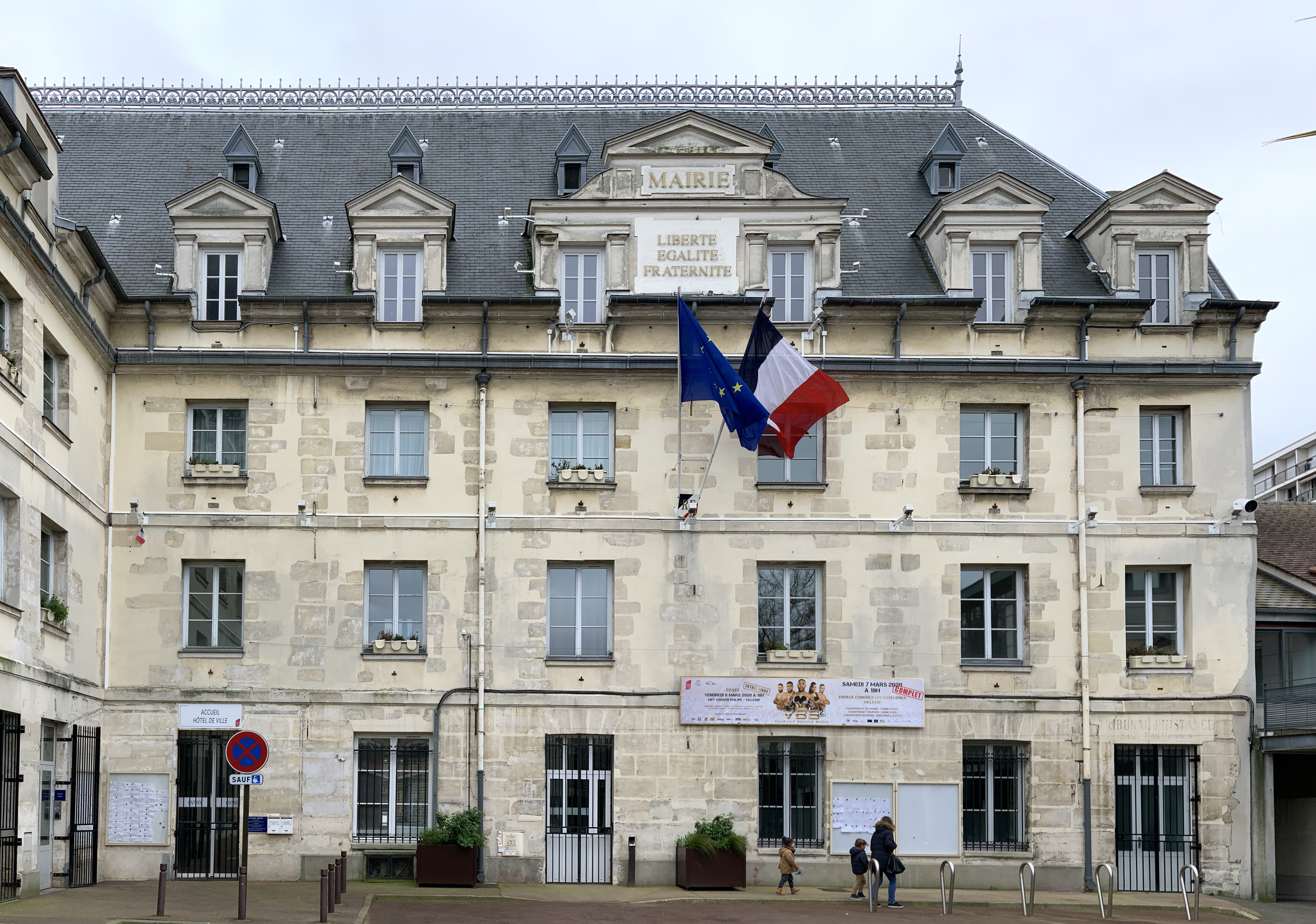
The Hôtel de Ville

The Hôtel de Ville, which was established as a seminary, dates back to 1608.

== Geography ==
=== Climate ===
Villejuif has an oceanic climate (Köppen climate classification Cfb). The average annual temperature in Villejuif is 12.4 °C (54.3 °F). The average annual rainfall is 670.1 mm (26.38 in) with October as the wettest month. The temperatures are highest on average in July, at around 20.5 °C (68.9 °F), and lowest in December, at around 4.9 °C (40.8 °F). The highest temperature ever recorded in Villejuif was 40.5 °C (104.9 °F) on 6 August 2003; the coldest temperature ever recorded was −12.2 °C (10.0 °F) on 8 February 1991.

Climate data for Villejuif (1981–2010 normals, extremes 1989–2014)
Month	Jan	Feb	Mar	Apr	May	Jun	Jul	Aug	Sep	Oct	Nov	Dec	Year
Record high °C (°F)	16.4 (61.5)	20.4 (68.7)	23.5 (74.3)	29.6 (85.3)	33.0 (91.4)	37.6 (99.7)	37.3 (99.1)	40.5 (104.9)	32.4 (90.3)	30.5 (86.9)	21.6 (70.9)	17.0 (62.6)	40.5 (104.9)
Mean daily maximum °C (°F)	7.6 (45.7)	9.0 (48.2)	12.9 (55.2)	16.1 (61.0)	20.7 (69.3)	23.3 (73.9)	25.9 (78.6)	25.9 (78.6)	21.6 (70.9)	16.7 (62.1)	10.9 (51.6)	7.4 (45.3)	16.5 (61.7)
Daily mean °C (°F)	5.0 (41.0)	5.8 (42.4)	8.7 (47.7)	11.3 (52.3)	15.7 (60.3)	18.2 (64.8)	20.5 (68.9)	20.5 (68.9)	16.6 (61.9)	12.7 (54.9)	7.9 (46.2)	4.9 (40.8)	12.4 (54.3)
Mean daily minimum °C (°F)	2.4 (36.3)	2.5 (36.5)	4.5 (40.1)	6.5 (43.7)	10.6 (51.1)	13.1 (55.6)	15.1 (59.2)	15.0 (59.0)	11.7 (53.1)	8.8 (47.8)	5.0 (41.0)	2.5 (36.5)	8.2 (46.8)
Record low °C (°F)	−12.0 (10.4)	−12.2 (10.0)	−7.2 (19.0)	−1.0 (30.2)	0.6 (33.1)	4.9 (40.8)	7.0 (44.6)	7.4 (45.3)	4.2 (39.6)	−1.5 (29.3)	−7.8 (18.0)	−9.9 (14.2)	−12.2 (10.0)
Average precipitation mm (inches)	58.1 (2.29)	47.0 (1.85)	51.2 (2.02)	53.8 (2.12)	62.8 (2.47)	52.1 (2.05)	61.9 (2.44)	52.1 (2.05)	49.6 (1.95)	64.2 (2.53)	55.0 (2.17)	62.3 (2.45)	670.1 (26.38)
Average precipitation days (≥ 1.0 mm)	11.2	10.2	10.9	10.1	10.6	8.8	8.1	7.7	8.4	10.3	10.8	12.0	119.0
Source: Météo-France

== Demographics ==
=== Population ===
Historical population

Year	Pop.	±% p.a.
1793	1,362	—
1800	1,137	−2.55%
1806	1,320	+2.52%
1821	1,278	−0.22%
1831	1,377	+0.75%
1836	1,652	+3.71%
1841	1,503	−1.87%
1846	1,587	+1.09%
1851	1,514	−0.94%
1856	1,559	+0.59%
1861	1,813	+3.06%
1866	2,308	+4.95%
1872	1,917	−3.05%
1876	2,117	+2.51%
1881	2,678	+4.81%
1886	3,163	+3.39%
1891	4,294	+6.30%
1896	5,234	+4.04%
1901	5,835	+2.20%

Year	Pop.	±% p.a.
1906	6,600	+2.49%
1911	8,671	+5.61%
1921	11,725	+3.06%
1926	18,751	+9.85%
1931	25,192	+6.08%
1936	27,540	+1.80%
1946	25,359	−0.82%
1954	29,280	+1.81%
1962	46,116	+5.84%
1968	51,120	+1.73%
1975	55,606	+1.21%
1982	52,448	−0.83%
1990	48,405	−1.00%
1999	47,384	−0.24%
2007	51,410	+1.02%
2012	56,504	+1.91%
2017	54,753	−0.63%
2023	60,183	+1.59%

Source: EHESS and INSEE (1968–2023)

=== Immigration ===
Place of birth of residents of Villejuif in 1999
Born in metropolitan France	Born outside metropolitan France			
76.1%	23.9%			
76.1%	Born in overseas France	Born in foreign countries with French citizenship at birth^{1}	EU-15 immigrants^{2}	Non-EU-15 immigrants
76.1%	2.8%	2.9%	5.6%	12.6%
^{1} This group is made up largely of former French settlers, such as pieds-noirs in Northwest Africa, followed by former colonial citizens who had French citizenship at birth (such as was often the case for the native elite in French colonies), as well as to a lesser extent foreign-born children of French expatriates. A foreign country is understood as a country not part of France in 1999, so a person born for example in 1950 in Algeria, when Algeria was an integral part of France, is nonetheless listed as a person born in a foreign country in French statistics.^{2} An immigrant is a person born in a foreign country not having French citizenship at birth. An immigrant may have acquired French citizenship since moving to France, but is still considered an immigrant in French statistics. On the other hand, persons born in France with foreign citizenship (the children of immigrants) are not listed as immigrants.

== Transport ==
Villejuif is served by three stations on Paris Métro Line 7: Villejuif – Léo Lagrange, Villejuif – Paul Vaillant-Couturier, and Villejuif – Louis Aragon. Villejuif is also served by one station on Paris Métro Line 14: Villejuif–Gustave Roussy station.

== Notable people ==
- Camille Loiseau, the oldest person in France from 26 March 2005 to 12 August 2006, died in Villejuif aged 114
- Komitas, Armenian priest, musicologist and composer, died here
- David Bret, Anglo-French biographer.

== Hospitals ==
Villejuif has several hospitals on its territory :

- the Institut Gustave Roussy, an oncology hospital;
- the Hôpital Paul-Brousse;
- the Paul Guiraud hospital.

== Education ==
13 preschools, 11 elementary schools, and five junior high schools (Collège Aimé-Césaire, Collège Guy-Môquet, Collège Jean Lurçat, Collège Karl Marx, Collège Pasteur) are in Villejuif. Lycée intercommunal Darius-Milhaud (in Le Kremlin-Bicêtre) serves Villejuif.

Other institutions:

- EFREI
- École Pour l'Informatique et les Techniques Avancées
- Institut Sup'Biotech de Paris

== Twin towns – sister cities ==
Villejuif is twinned with:

- Dunaújváros, Hungary
- Mirandola, Italy
- Neubrandenburg, Germany
- Vila Franca de Xira, Portugal
- Yambol, Bulgaria

== See also ==
- The leaflet of Villejuif
- Communes of the Val-de-Marne department
- Hôtel de la Capitainerie des Chasses
