= Jean-Marie Querville =

French Navy officer (1903–1967)

Jean-Marie Querville

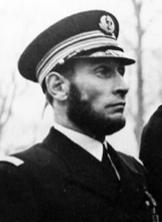
- Querville in 1942 as a Capitaine de frigate in the FNFL
- Born: 9 January 1903; France
- Died: 30 December 1967 (aged 64)
- Allegiance: France
- Branch: French Navy
- Service years: 1921 - 1962
- Rank: Admiral
- Commands: Sirène; Souffleur; Junon; 1st Submarine division of the FNFL; 1st Frigate division; Escort of "Chama" group; Cruiser Suffren; French Navy in Tonkin; Naval Division of Extrême-Orient; French Navy in Central Africa; Commander-in-Chief for the Mediterranean; 4th Region Maritime Prefect; Inspector general of the French Navy
- Conflicts: Rif War; World War II; Indochina War
- Awards: Grand officier de la Légion d'honneur; Compagnon de la Libération; Croix de guerre 1939-1945; Croix de Guerre des TOE

Jean-Marie Querville (9 January 1903 – 30 December 1967), was a French Navy officer of the Free French Naval Forces, a Compagnon de la Libération, became the Commander-in-Chief for the Mediterranean, then Maritime Prefect, following as an inspector general of the Marine Nationale and admiral.

== Military career ==
Querville entered into the École navale in 1921. He then served on the SMS Regensburg and participated to the 1925 Rif Campaign in Morocco. Enseigne de 1^{re}classe on 25 October, he obtained in May 1926 his brevet as a transmission officer, and navigated on the torpedo boat (French: Torpilleur), the Matelot Blanc (French: Matelot Blanc).

Assigned to the submarine service in 1927, he was in Madagascar in 1929. Promoted to lieutenant de vaisseau in March 1930, and second officer in charge of the submarine L'Aréthuse from 1931 to 1934. In August 1934, he assumed command of the submarine Sirène. In 1936, he commanded submarine Souffleur until 1938, prior to the submarine being sunk off the coast of Beirut on 25 June 1941.

The following year, at the beginning of Second World War, he was appointed to Indochina to serve as liaison agent to Singapore attached to the British. He was still there in May 1940.

=== Free French naval forces ===
Decided to pursue the fight against the Axis, Querville rejoined the United Kingdom in September 1940. Promoted to Capitaine de corvette, he was appointed to the État-major (general staff headquarters) of the Free French Naval Forces (FNFL) attached to a bureau in London.

In February 1941, he was given command of the submarine Junon. Five months later, in July 1941, he was promoted to CApitaine de frigate. The following month, in August 1941, he was entrusted with the command of the 1st Submarine Division of the Free French Naval Forces, composed of submarine Minerve, Rubis and Junon, which he trained into an elite unit.

His flag on Junon, Querville was tasked with intelligence missions, watching German cruisers and battleships hidden in the fjords of the coast of Norway, ferrying Resistance or intelligence operatives, and attacking enemy shipping. In September 1942, Junon transported British and Norwegian Commandos tasked with Norwegian heavy water sabotage. With the operation a success, Querville gained a reputation as a specialist of difficult missions.

Made a Compagnon de la Libération on 12 January 1943, he was assigned to the personal Staff of Charles de Gaulle and became a counsel member of the Ordre de la Libération. In Marche 1943, he returned to the commanded of Junon for a new mission, and then performed a mission to Algiers.

In November 1943, Querville took command of the 1st Frigate Division, with his flag on the brand-new Aventure. He participated to the Normandy landings in June 1944, commanding several escort missions to protect the U.S. contingents making up the "assault landing Group Chama" to Omaha Beach. Thereafter, he escorted 102 naval convoys between the United Kingdom and France. In the night of 22 June, the convoy which he was escorting was torpedoed by a squadron of Junkers Ju 88. Querville's return fire shot down one or two enemy planes, prompting the survivors to flee the scene. He then partook in the blockade of the Saint-Nazaire pocket until April 1945.

Between 1939 and 1945, Querville had been at sea for a total of 34 months.

=== Post-war admiral ===
In July 1945, Querville was promoted to capitaine de vaisseau, and was appointed to Indochina at the command of the heavy cruiser Suffren. During the Indochina War, he commanded the French Navy in Tonkin from 1948 to 1950, and was thrice mentioned in dispatches.

Promoted to contre-amiral, he became major-general of the port at Brest, starting from March 1951. He then returned to Viet-Nam, to take command of the Naval Division of the Extreme-Orient. He achieved two more mentions in dispatches, and remained at this position until March 1955.

Querville was promoted to vice-amiral in 1956, and received command of the French Navy in Central Africa. Promoted to squadron vice-admiral in 1959, he became Commander-in-Chief for the Mediterranean. He then became the Maritime Prefect of the 4th Region in Algeria.

Appointed inspector-general of the French Navy, he was promoted to full admiral in October 1962, before retiring.

Querville died on 30 December 1967.

== Honours ==
- Grand officier de la Légion d'honneur;
- Compagnon de la Libération, decree of 12 January 1943;
- Croix de guerre 1939-1945, with 6 mentions in dispatches;
- Croix de guerre des TOE, with 5 mentions in dispatches;
- Croix de la Valeur militaire with palms;
- Distinguished Service Order (United Kingdom);
- Distinguished Service Cross;
- Knight of the Order of St. Olav (Norway);
- Commander of the Ordre de l'Étoile noire (Benin);
- Officer of the Order of the Star of Anjouan;
- Grand officer of the National Order of Vietnam.

Ribbon bar (without palms and stars)

== See also ==
- List of French paratrooper units
- Georges Cabanier
