= Anne-Ségolène Abscheidt =

French professor

- Citizenship: French
- Education: Master's degree École navale
- Occupation: CEO
- Employer: IPSA
- Known for: CEO of Institut polytechnique des sciences avancées
- Predecessor: Valérie Cornetet

Anne-Ségolène Abscheidt is a French professor and naval engineer. Since June 2023, she is the CEO of the Institut polytechnique des sciences avancées, a French aerospace College.

She is also vice-president of Ingénieurs et scientifiques de France.

== Biography ==
Graduated with a Master's degree from the École navale in 1997, Anne-Ségolène Abscheidt was notably an operational manager at the Ministry of Armed Forces on the campuses of Brest and Toulon from 1997 to 2005. She took up the direction of communication and partnerships for the Lorraine Region. From 2007 to 2013, Anne-Ségolène Abscheidt led restructuring projects at the Ministry of Armed Forces (Paris).

In addition (2009–2013), she carries out studies and business plans for several business projects. Since 2013, she founded and managed Orientalis Conseil, a start-up specializing in advice and training for young people.

Anne-Ségolène Abscheidt was previously head of training at the EIGSI La Rochelle engineering school since October 2020. She was director general of the ESCEM management school (now Excelia Tours & Orléans) between April 2016 and June 2020.

From February 2022 till May 2023, she is the academic Director of Eductive, French educational company.

On 1 June 2023, she is nominated CEO of the Institut polytechnique des sciences avancées, taking over from Valérie Cornetet.

She is also vice-president of Ingénieurs et scientifiques de France.
