= ISSAT =

ISSAT may refer to:

- Institute of Space, its Applications and Technologies, a French association
- Tis Issat, a waterfall on the Blue Nile river in Ethiopia
