= Institut polytechnique des sciences avancées =

French aerospace engineering college

Coordinates: 48°48′49″N 2°23′33″E

Institut Polytechnique des Sciences Avancées
- Motto: L'air, l'espace, l'IPSA
- Motto in English: The air, the space, the IPSA
- Type: Private, Grande École
- Established: 1961
- Affiliations: 3AF, CDEFI, Concours Advance, Erasmus, ISSAT
- Director-Général: Anne-Ségolène Abscheidt
- Administrative staff: 200 (in 2022)
- Students: 2,188 (in 2022)
- Location: Ivry-sur-Seine, Lyon, Marseille, Toulouse, France
- Campus: Urban
- Colours
- Nickname: IPSA
- Website: www.ipsa.fr

The Institut Polytechnique des Sciences Avancées (IPSA) (English: Institute of Polytechnic Science and Aeronautics; Occitan: Institut de Sciéncia Politécnica e Aeronautica) is a French private grande école in aerospace engineering located at Ivry-sur-Seine, Lyon and Toulouse, recognized by the French state since 2010, whose diploma has been accredited by the French Commission des Titres d'Ingénieur since 2011. It was founded in 1961 and has been part of IONIS Education Group since 1998.

== History ==
=== From creation to integration into IONIS Education group ===
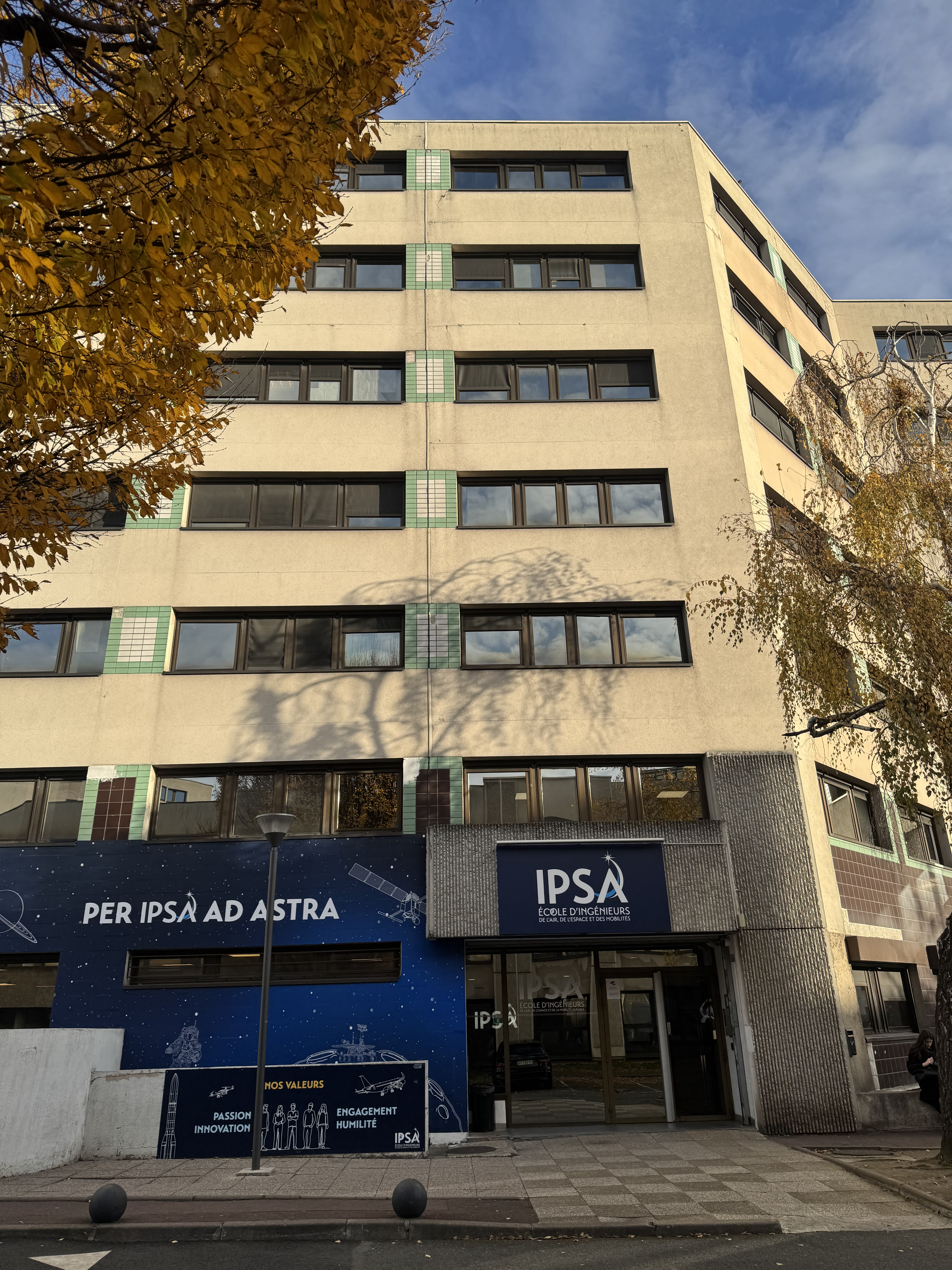
Main entrance IPSA Paris

IPSA was founded in 1961 in Paris by Michel Cazin, the private secretary of Louis de Broglie and a teacher at the mechanical department of CNAM, Maurice Pradier and Paul Lefort. Twenty students started the training. In 1982, the first scholar trip was organized to the European Space Agency center in Guyana. In 1987 the school was bought by Henri Hertert, an airline pilot at Air France and an IPSA alumnus. In 1989 the institute moved into the towers Les Mercuriales at Bagnolet, where it stayed for ten years. Beset by financial difficulties, the university was bought by IONIS Education Group in 1998 and moved to Le Kremlin-Bicetre close to the university EPITA.

=== Gradual recognition of the university ===
Campuses of the Institut Polytechnique des Sciences Avancées

The Master issued by IPSA was recognized by the French state at level 1 (higher level) in 2005, after accreditation by the Commission Nationale de la Certification Professionnelle. In 2007, IPSA opened a second campus in Toulouse, joined the Erasmus Programme and concluded double degree agreements with foreign universities. Following its establishment in Toulouse, the university joined the Institut au service du spatial, de ses applications et technologies in 2008. The next year, IPSA joined Aerospace Valley and moved to Ivry-sur-Seine close to the university ESME-Sudria before being accredited by the French state in 2010.

In 2011, the university was accredited by the Commission des Titres d'Ingénieur to grant the title of ingénieur diplômé de l'IPSA.

During the evaluation process, the Commission noticed the strong points of the university (the kaizen, the motivation of teachers and students, the good job placement, ...) and the weak points (research activities to be developed, English level of the students to improve, the need to have more courses in social sciences, equipments on many campuses, ...). The CTI also asks for a new recruitment process which has been done rapidly by the creation of a competitive examination called Concours Advance. In January 2013, IPSA joined the Conference of the Directors of French Engineering Schools. The CTI agreement is extended in May 2013. In 2018, the university gets the EUR-ACE label. Since 1 January 2021, the college is member of the Union of Independent Grandes Écoles. and since 20 June 2023 of the Conférence des Grandes écoles.

The college organizes the yearly air show IPS'AIR. The last edition took place in February 2023.

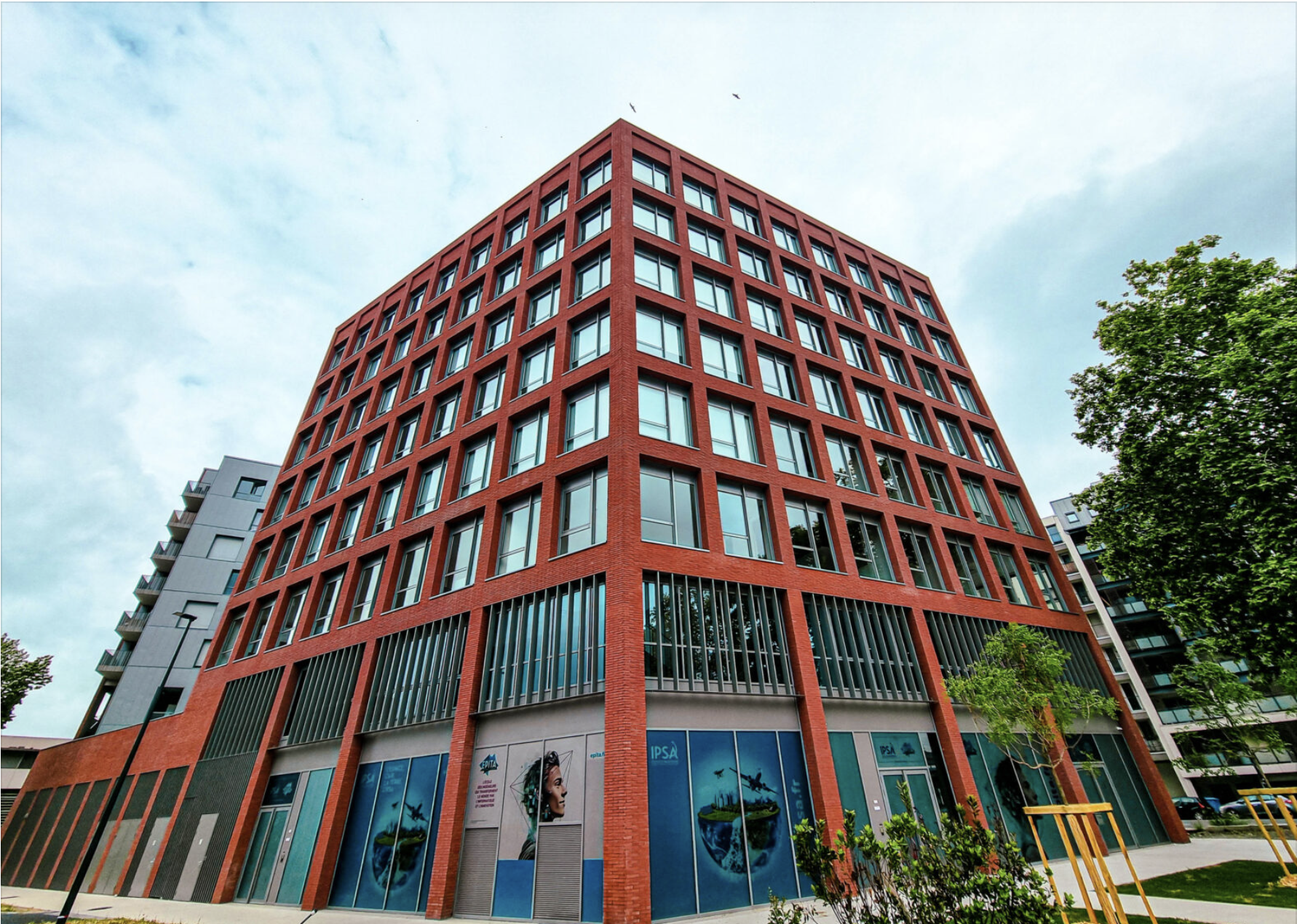
IPSA Toulouse campus

=== History of directors ===
The current director is Anne-Ségolène Abscheidt, who is also the vice-president of Ingénieurs et scientifiques de France. She is the tenth person to hold that function since 1961. She was appointed director of IPSA in June 2023.

List of directors
Name	Years
Michel Cazin	1961 to 1987
Maurice Pradier	1961 to 1987
Paul Lefort	1961 to 1987
Henri Herter (IPSA 1976)	1987 to 1998
Guy Robin	1998 to 1999
Aimé Merran	1999 to 2009
Hervé Renaudeau	2009 to 2016
Francis Pollet	2017 to 2022
Valérie Cornetet	2022 to 2023
Anne-Ségolène Abscheidt	Since 2023

== Governance ==
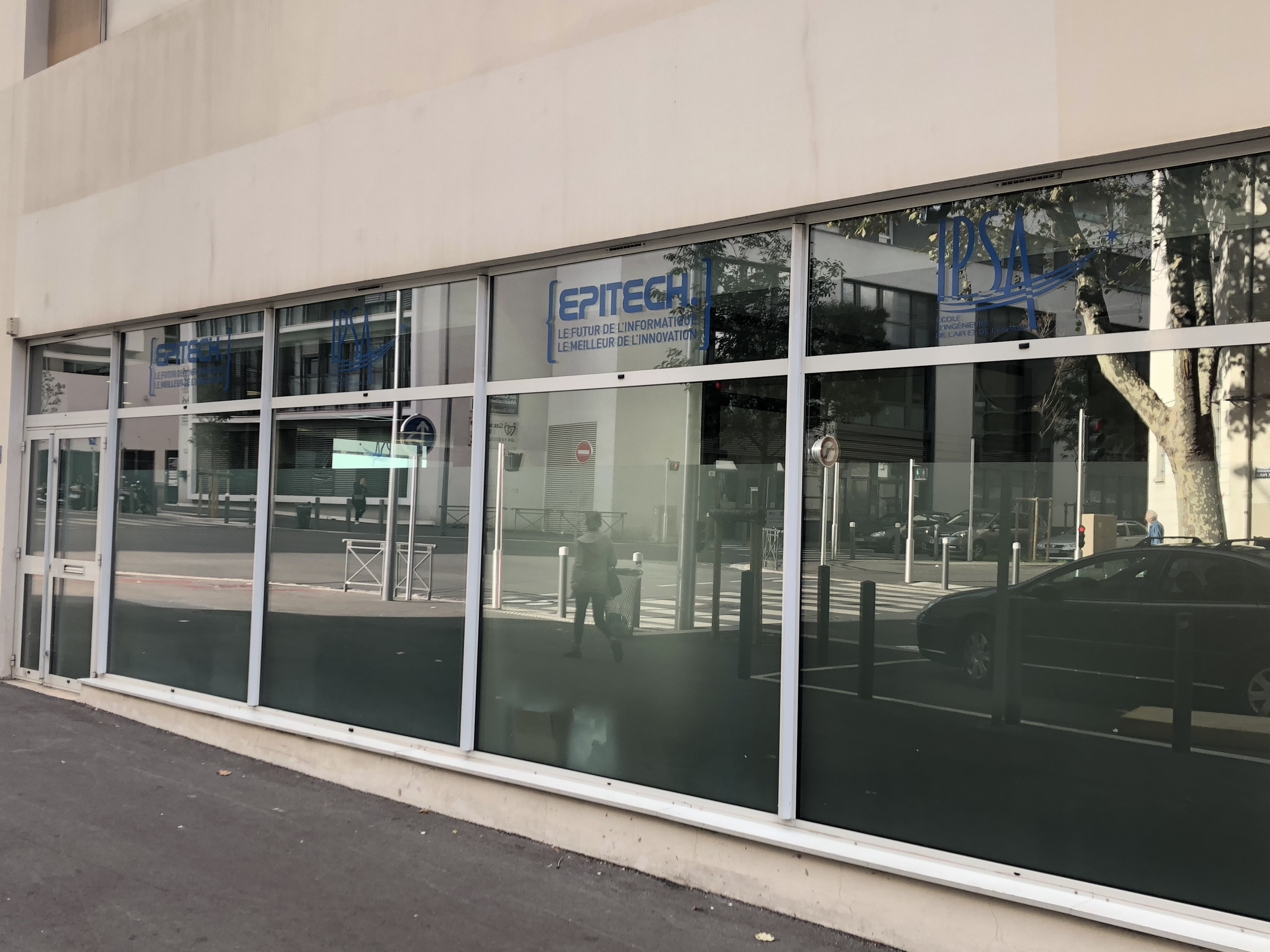
IPSA Marseille Campus

The school is owned by IONIS Education Group, and its president is the president of the group, Marc Sellam.

== Training and research ==
=== Curriculum ===
IPSA declares it aims to be close to other postgraduate engineering schools with a strong theoretical training for research and development jobs in order to graduate engineers specializing in aerospace engineering with a good general aerospace knowledge. It offers a five-year course with five possibilities in the fourth year: "energy, spacecraft propulsion and engine", "mechanics and aircraft structure", "telecommunications, radar and radio navigation", "embedded systems", or "mechatronics". The students also choose one of ten minors: "Entrepreneurship", "business marketing", "association management", "Research Management", "Conduct of an international project", "project personnel development", "Board and consulting", " human resource management", "cultural management", "financial management".

In the fifth year, four options are available independently of the choice made in the fourth year: "Avionics", "Aeronautical Systems Design", "Space Systems Design" and "Management and Industrial Logistics".

From the first year on the school offers lessons relating to aeronautics in addition to basic scientific education, and a large part of the teaching throughout the curriculum is project-based. Students also have the opportunity to attend a technical and managerial course sanctioned by an MBA in "business and international negotiation" of the Institut supérieur de gestion in addition to the diploma of the school, or to make the last year of studies in a foreign university in partnership with IPSA. Eleven months of internship are planned in the curriculum.

After graduation, graduates are represented by the association AAEIPSA (IPSA Alumni association). 70% of them work in the aerospace industry, mainly in research and development (46%) and in the Île-de-France region (57%).

Admission to the school is possible after a baccalauréat by succeeding at the competition "Advance" organized in partnership with EPITA and ESME-Sudria. In total, the three schools offer approximately 900 places. It is also possible to enter the school in the second, third or fourth year of studies for students coming from classe préparatoire aux grandes écoles, Bachelor or Master.

Since 2017, the school also offers Bachelors in aeronautics in addition to the Master's degree program describe above.

=== International relations ===
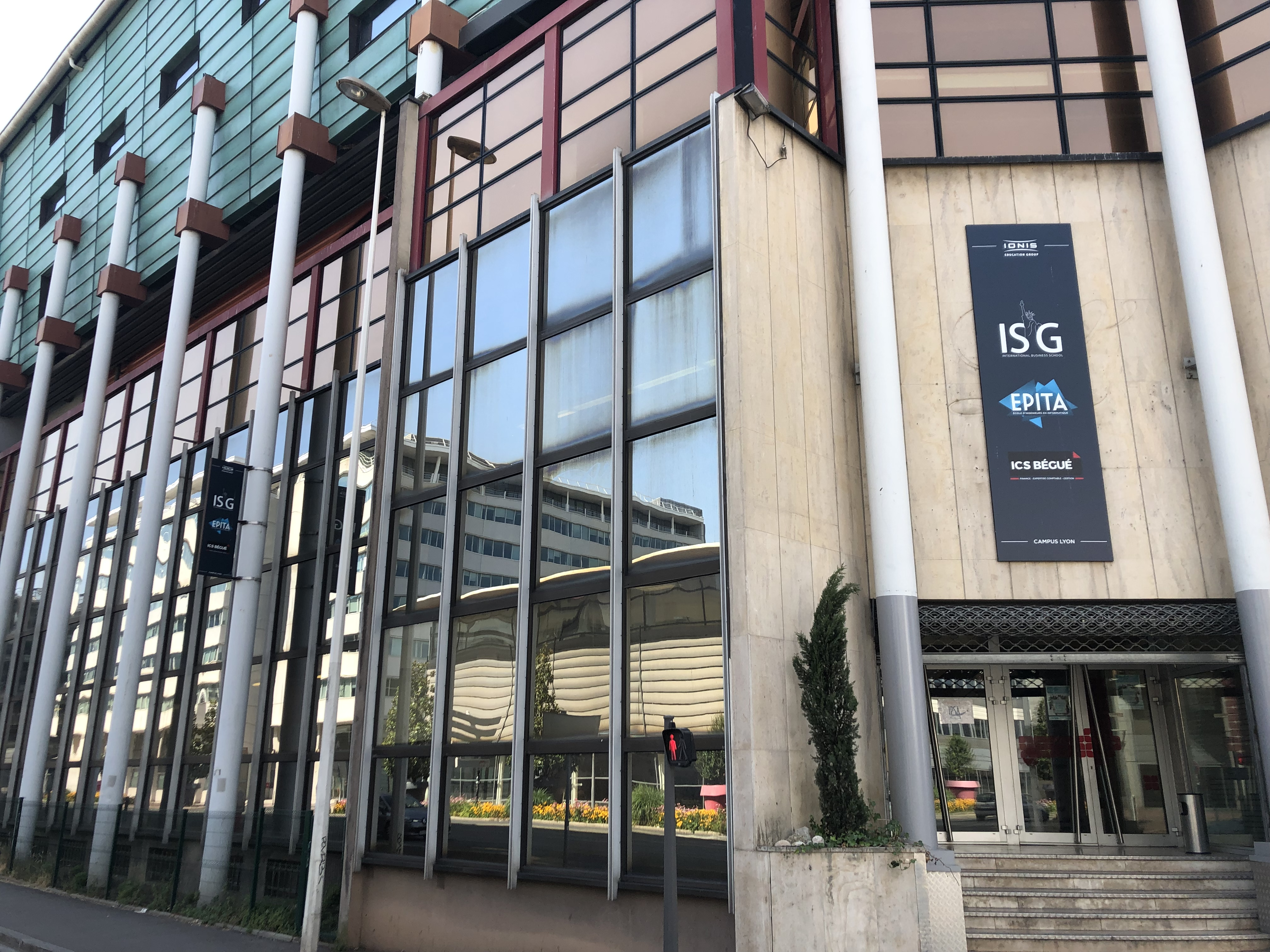
Lyon Campus

Partnerships allowing students to obtain a Master of Science in addition to the degree of IPSA exist with Shenyang Aerospace University in China, Cranfield University in the UK, Moscow State University in Russia, the Université Laval in Canada and the National Cheng Kung University in Taiwan.

Students also have access to the Erasmus Programme.

The university has bilateral agreements with The University of Arizona, University of California, San Diego.

=== Research activities ===
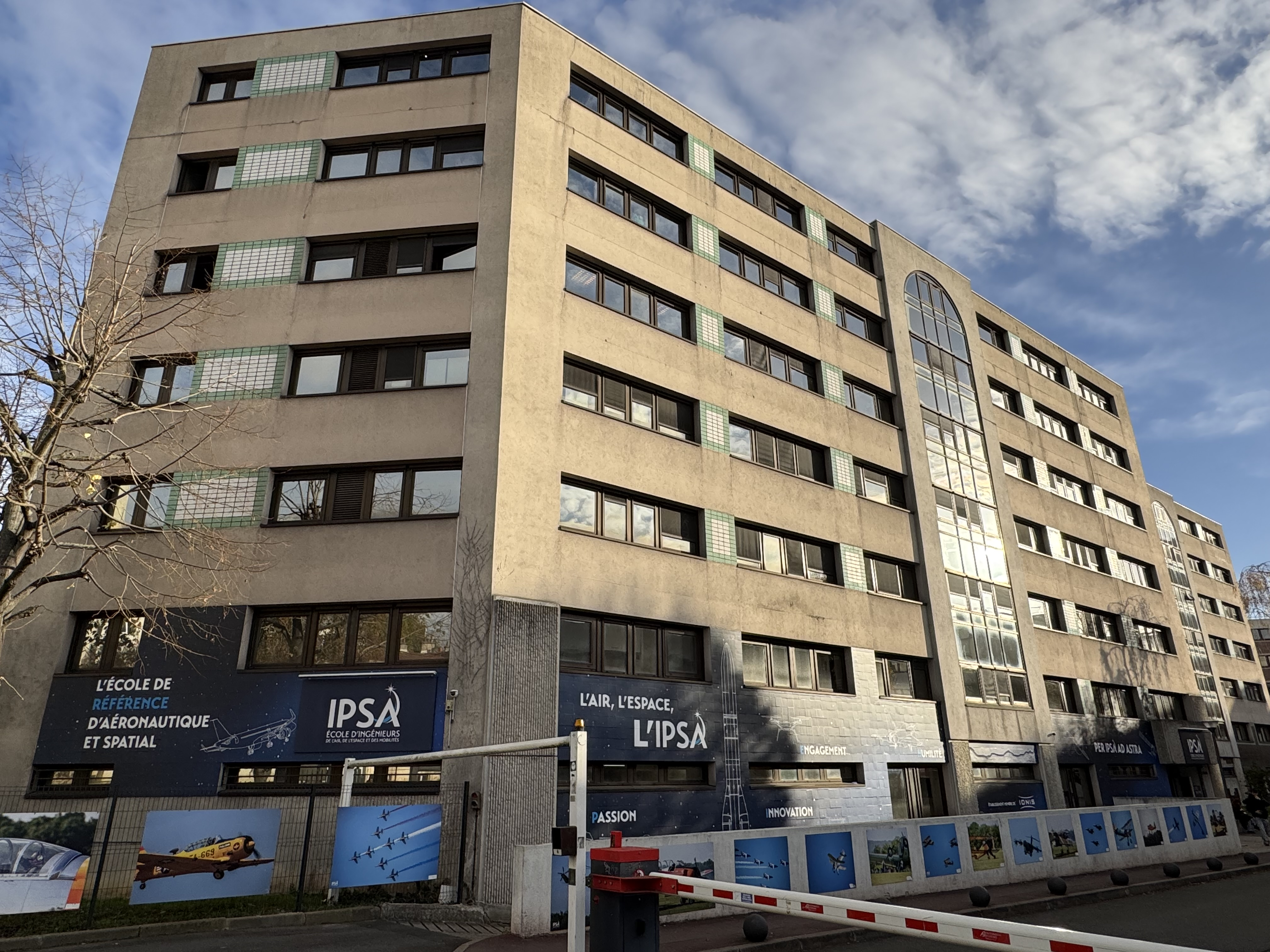
Main Building IPSA Paris

In 2011, IPSA features three research laboratories: 3D computer graphics and calculation, mechatronics, and fluid mechanics applied to aerodynamics.

The laboratory of 3D computer graphics and calculation investigates new algorithms to solve problems of processing and analysis of signals and images. An agreement of partnership with the laboratoire des signaux et systèmes (L2S) (signals and systems laboratory), a laboratory of CNRS based at Supélec, was signed in 2010.

In 2006, IPS'action association launched the UNIV'air challenge in order to present students with research projects in partnership with the Association Aéronautique et Astronautique de France and other universities such as SUPAERO or EPF. In 2008, a UAVs project named "Hélitronix" and realized by students and researchers of the mechatronics laboratory was selected during the Minidrone challenge funded by DGA and organized by ONERA. The same laboratory works on the "Perseus project" which consists of the development of rockets for CNES, in partnership with the AéroIPSAstudent association.

Moreover, IPSA participates in the cluster ASTech Paris Région. It contributes to its development in many sectors: aircraft engine, onboard energy, aircraft design, material, training and research, and maintenance.

In November 2011, the laboratory of fluid mechanics applied to aerodynamics adopted a new calculation tool allowing for the commissioning of a digital wind tunnel by the end of 2011.

A team from the university has received the 2011 GIFAS award for the student aerospace challenge.

== Notable alumni ==
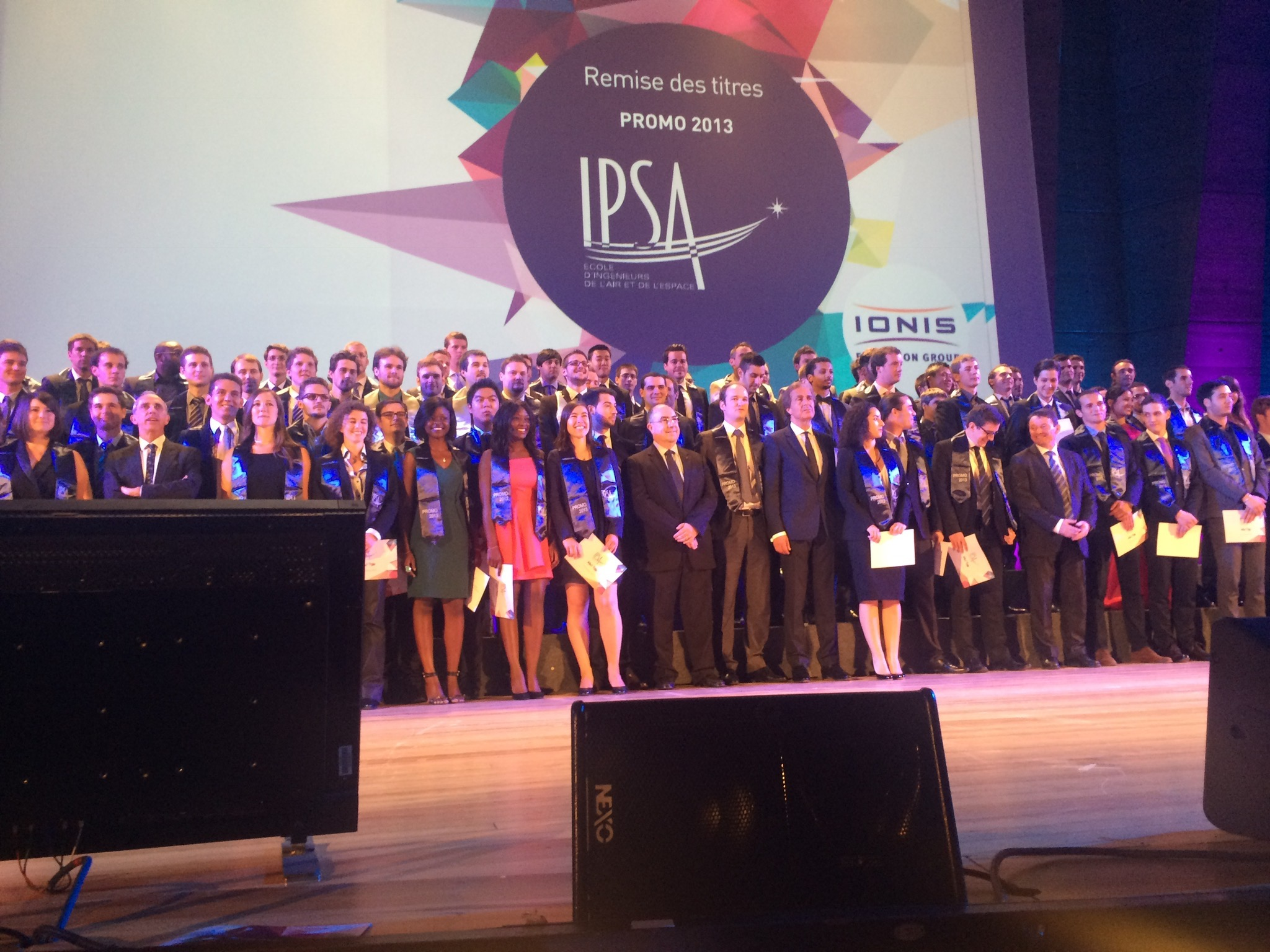
IPSA Class of 2013

== Bibliography ==
- Lucien Robineau (dir.), Les Français du ciel : Dictionnaire historique, Paris, le cherche midi, 2005, 782 p. (ISBN 2749104157), p. 628
- (in French) Mehdi. D, Saint-Agne. Epitech et l'Ipsa misent sur la Ville rose, La Dépêche du Midi, 6 April 2007
- André Turcat, Pilote d'essais : Mémoires II, Paris, le cherche midi, 2009, 199 p. (ISBN 978-2-7491-1374-6), p. 197
- (in French) Ginibrière Gaëlle, IPSA : 50 ans avec l'aéronautique, L'Express Emploi, 15 June 2009
- GIFAS, Une formation pour un métier dans l'industrie aéronautique et spatiale, Paris, 2013, 65 p., p. 46
- (in French) Mariama Diallo, L'IPSA, école d'ingénieurs aéronautique depuis 1961 , Le Journal de l'aviation, 24 April 2012
- (in French) Le futur de l'avion : Les prochains défis de l’industrie aéronautique, Ivry-sur-Seine, FYP Éditions, 2020, 160 p. (ISBN 978-2-36405-203-1)
