= French submarine Junon (1935) =

French Navy Submarine

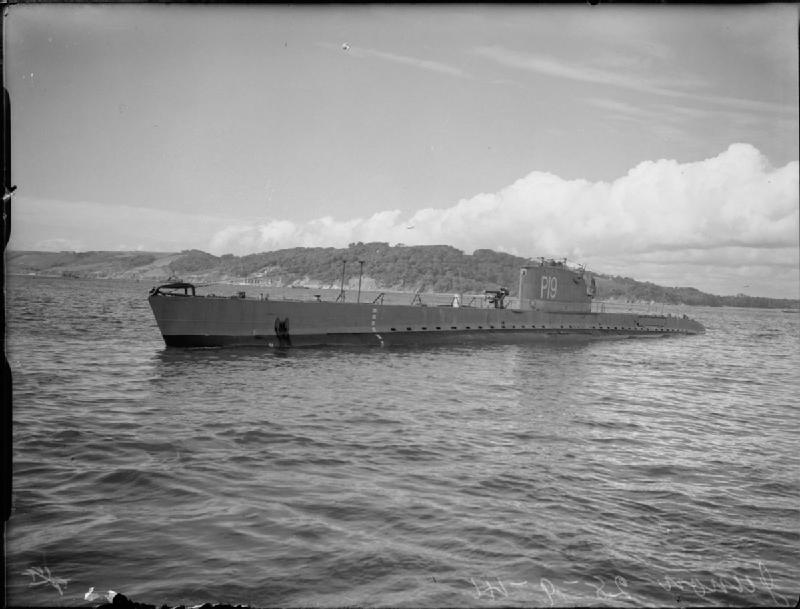

History

France
- Name: Junon
- Namesake: Juno
- Builder: Chantiers et Ateliers Augustin Normand, Le Havre
- Laid down: 9 June 1932
- Launched: 15 September 1935
- Commissioned: 20 September 1937
- Decommissioned: 6 December 1954
- Fate: Scrapped, 1960

General characteristics
- Type: Submarine
- Displacement: 662 long tons (673 t) surfaced; 856 long tons (870 t) submerged
- Length: 68.1 m (223 ft 5 in)
- Beam: 5.6 m (18 ft 4 in)
- Draught: 4 m (13 ft 1 in)
- Propulsion: 2 × Vickers-Normand diesel engines, 1,800 bhp (1,342 kW); 2 × Electric motors, 1,230 shp (917 kW)
- Speed: 14.2 knots (26.3 km/h; 16.3 mph) surfaced; 9 knots (17 km/h; 10 mph) submerged
- Range: 2,000 nmi (3,700 km; 2,300 mi) at 10 knots (19 km/h; 12 mph) surfaced; 85 nmi (157 km; 98 mi) at 5 knots (9.3 km/h; 5.8 mph) submerged
- Test depth: 80 m (260 ft)
- Complement: 42
- Armament: 1 × 75 mm (3 in)/35 Model 1928 deck gun with 150 rounds; 2 × 13.2 mm (0.52 in) AA machine guns; 6 × 550 mm (21.7 in) internal torpedo tubes (4 bow/2 stern) with 12 torpedoes; 3 × 400 mm (15.7 in) external torpedo tubes

Junon (Q186) was a Minerve-class submarine of the French Navy. During World War II she served in the Free French Naval Forces.

== Ship history ==
The submarine was laid down at the Chantiers et Ateliers Augustin Normand yard at Le Havre on 9 June 1932. She was launched on 15 September 1935, and commissioned on 20 September 1937.

Under the command of Lieutenant de vaisseau Jaume from August 1939, Junon operated from Oran and Casablanca early in the war, finally sailing to France in March 1940 for refitting.

Following the German invasion of France, Junon left Brest on 18 June 1940, towed by the tugboat Nessus and accompanied by her sister ship Minerve towed by Zeelew, under escort from the patrol vessels Pessac and Sauternes. Off Ushant, they were joined by the destroyer HMS Broke and arrived at Plymouth on 20 June.

On 3 July 1940 Junon (along with all other French naval vessels in British ports) was boarded by Royal Navy troops as part of Operation Catapult. She was transferred to the Free French Naval Forces on 27 July but not recommissioned until February 1941, under the command of Capitaine de corvette Jean-Marie Querville.

Querville was promoted to Capitaine de frégate in July 1941 and in August, Junon became the flagship of the 1ère Division de sous-marins des FNFL (1st Free French Submarine Division) along with Minerve and Rubis.

In December 1941 Junon patrolled the Bay of Biscay, observing German ships based in Brest. She spent much of 1942 operating off the Norwegian coast. On 13 March 1942 she was depth-charged and damaged during a patrol and in August patrolled in the vicinity of Sognefjord. On 15 September she landed a group of British and Norwegian commandos near Glomfjord for Operation Musketoon. In October she made three attacks on ships in the Vestfjorden, at least one of which (Nordland) was successful and on 13 November picked up several agents and their radio equipment in the Melfjorden.

On 1 March 1943 command of Junon was assumed by Lieutenant de vaisseau Étienne Schlumberger and in February 1944, after a long refit, she sailed for Algiers. After operations in the Mediterranean, on 11 August 1944 she was placed in reserve at Oran and her crew transferred to the submarine {{emMorse}}. After the war Junon was finally refitted at Brest from August 1945 and was recommissioned on 20 October 1945 under the command of Jean Dischamps to serve at the sonar training school at Brest and in ASW exercises from Toulon. Junon was eventually decommissioned on 6 December 1954and scrapped in 1960.

== See also ==
- List of submarines of France
