= Georges Cabanier =

French Naval Officer and Admiral

Georges Cabanier

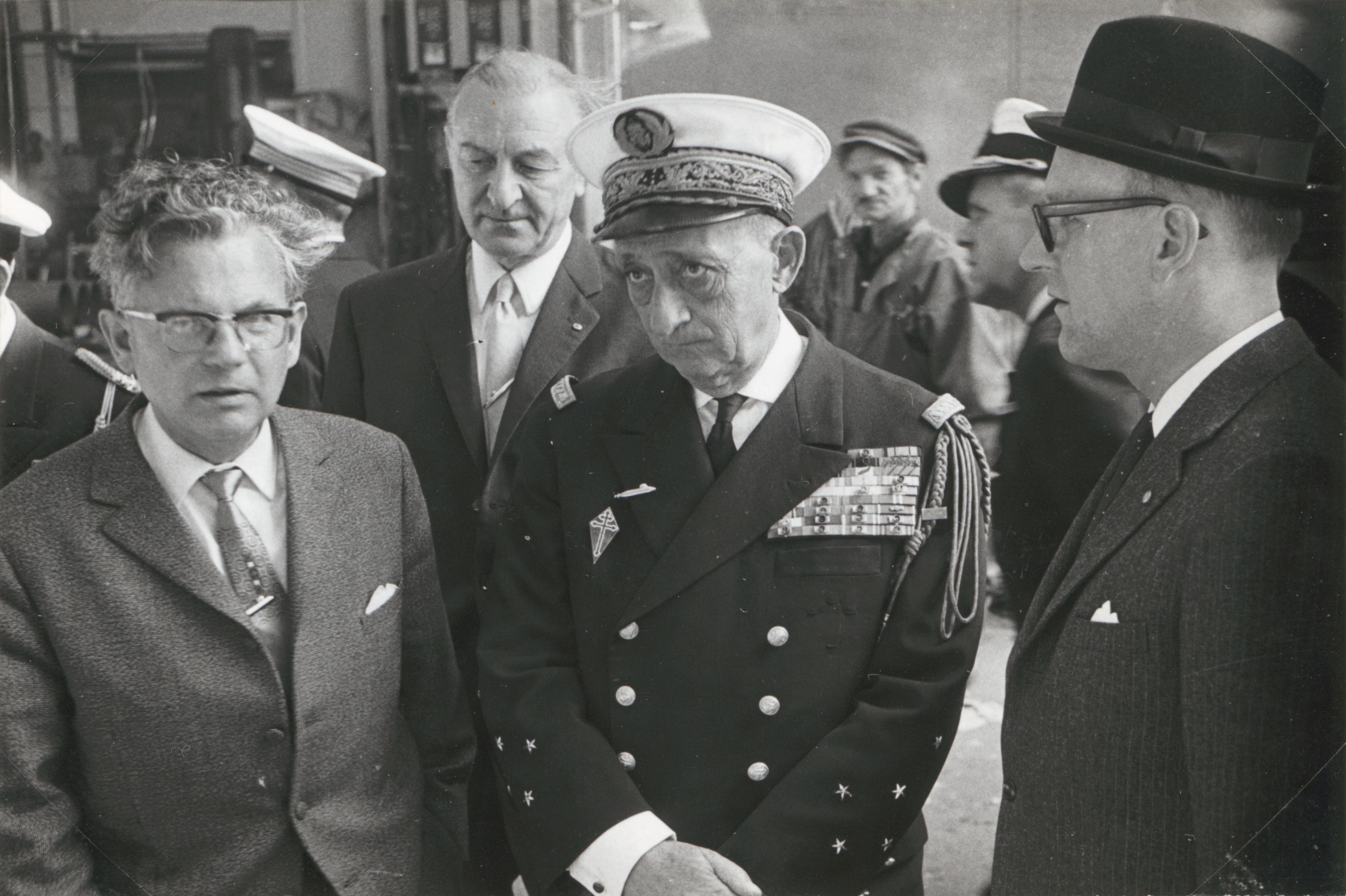
- Admiral Cabanier on visit in Malmö, Sweden in 1967.
- Born: 21 November 1906; France
- Died: 26 October 1976 (aged 69); Paris, France
- Military career
- Allegiance: France
- Branch: French Navy; Free French Naval Forces; French Navy
- Service years: 1925–1975
- Rank: Admiral
- Commands: Rubis; Cap des Palmes; GASM; Jeanne d'Arc; École Navale; CEMM (1960–1968)
- Conflicts: World War II
- Awards: Grand Cross of the Legion of Honour; Order of Liberation; Médaille militaire Croix de Guerre 1939–1945; Croix de guerre des théâtres d'opérations extérieures Resistance Medal; War Cross; Legion of Merit
- Other work: Grand Chancelier of the Légion d'honneur GC-L.H (1969–1975)

Admiral Georges Cabanier (21 November 1906 – 26 October 1976) was a French Naval Officer and Admiral, in addition to Grand Chancellor of the Legion of Honour.

== Military career ==
Entered into the École Navale in 1925, he navigated on several naval warships (French: bâtiments) in the Atlantic, before opting for submarine service.

In 1928, he served successively on both the Du Couëdic and Duperré Avisos, then on the military transport Seine.

In 1930, he partook to campaigns in Antilles, Bermudes, Acores and Terre-neuve on board aviso Aldebaran. After one year at the torpedo officer and electricians school, Georges Cabanier opted for a career as a submariner in the submarine service (French: La sous-marinade). In 1932, he embarked on board 1500 ton-class submarine L'Achéron, then on submarine Le Saphir. Lieutenant de vaisseau in 1934, he served on submarine Orion, in 1936, on submarine cruiser Surcouf, on which he partook to an endurance cruise in the South Atlantic.

In 1938, he served, then was designated as commandant of the mine laying Rubis.

Since June 1940, he opted to serve the camp of Free France with the quasi-totality of his crew. His Rubis FNFL pavilion pursued patrols in the Northern seas and conducted several mine laying missions in the larger oceanic area of Norway.

First under the orders of capitaine de corvette Cabanier then Lieutenant de vaisseau Rousselot, the Rubis was one of the most effective submarines of the French Navy during the second world war.

Capitaine de corvette in January 1941, he joined the Pacific (December 1941), where he was designated chef d'état-major of admiral Georges Thierry d'Argenlieu.

Capitaine de frigate (1943), he commanded the auxiliary croiseur Cap des Palmes (1944), which operated in the South Pacific with the 3rd Fleet of the United States Navy.

Capitaine de vaisseau in October 1945, he represented France at the United Nations Conference on International Organization of San Francisco (April 1945), and two months later, assumed the command of the French Naval School (June 1945) and in 1947 the school-cruiser Jeanne d'Arc.

He served as the Naval attaché to the U.S. in July 1949, and received his contre-amiral stars in January 1951.

In January 1953, the contre-amiral Cabanier was designated as secretary general adjoint of the Défense nationale (French: Secrétaire général adjoint de la Défense nationale).

In March 1954, he was the head of the naval contingent in Indochina. Upon his return to France in February 1956, he was designated as the chef de l'État-major of the particular naval state secretary (French: chef de l'État-major particulier du secrétaire d'état à la Marine).

Vice-amiral in November 1956, he assumed a couple of days later the command of Anti-Submarine Action Group (French: Groupe d'Action Anti-sous-marine - GASM). In 1957, Admiral Cabanier intervened so that the Rubis (along with corvette Aconit, the only two Compagnon de la Libération naval warships of the French Navy), would not get disposed of. Accordingly, a sonar target use was assigned which resulted in drowning the boat indefinitely in the Mediterranean Sea. In June 1958, he was assigned as chef d'État-major de la Défense nationale (French: chef d'État-major de la Défense nationale) of the cabinet of général de Gaulle.

Vice-admiral of a naval squadron in November 1958, then Admiral on 1 July 1960, he was designated as Chief of Staff of the French Navy CEMM and held tenure in this post until 1 January 1968.

From 15 February 1969 until 14 February 1975, he was designated as the Grand Chancellor of the Legion of Honor (French: Grand Chancelier de la Légion d'honneur).

The Ashes of Admiral Cabanier, Vice-Admiral Rousselot and the last survivor of the crew, were dispersed of on top of L'Épave of French Submarine Rubis.

== Decorations ==

- Grand-croix de la Légion d'honneur
- Compagnon de la Libération - decreed 25 May 1943
- Grand-croix de l'Ordre National du Mérite
- Croix de guerre 1939-1945 (3 citations)
- Croix de guerre des théâtres d'opérations extérieures
- Médaille de la Résistance with rosette
- Croix du combattant volontaire de la Résistance
- Chevalier de l'ordre des Palmes académiques
- Commandeur de l'Ordre du Mérite Maritime
- Médaille coloniale avec agrafe « Extrême Orient »
- Médaille commémorative des services volontaires of Free France
- Médaille commémorative de la guerre 1939-1945
- Médaille commémorative de la Campagne d'Indochine
- Grand-croix de l'ordre de l'Étoile noire
- Grand officier de l'ordre du Nicham El Anouar
- Distinguished Service Order (United Kingdom, U.K)
- Commandeur du Legion of Merit (United States, U.S.)
- Croix des Vétérans (United States, U.S.)
- Croix de guerre with glaive (Norway)
- Médaille de la Participation (Norway)
- Grand-croix de l'Ordre royal de l'Épée (Sweden)
- Commandeur de l'Ordre de Dannebrog (Denmark)
- Grand-croix de l'Ordre d'Orange-Nassau (Netherlands)
- Grand-croix de l'Ordre du Mérite de la République Fédérale d'Allemagne with star and shoulder-sash (Germany)
- Grand-croix avec ruban bleu de l'ordre du Mérite naval (Spain)
- Grand-croix de l'ordre militaire d'Avis (Portugal)
- Grand-croix de l'Ordre de l'Infant Dom Henri (Portugal)
- Commandeur de l'ordre « Au Mérite » (Italy)
- Grand officier de l'Ordre de Georges Ier (Greece)
- Grand-croix de l'Ordre Polonia Restituta (Poland)
- Ordre de la République socialiste de Roumanie
- Grand cordon de l'Ordre National du Cèdre (Lebanon)
- Grand officier de l'Ordre du Ouissam alaouite (Morocco)
- Grand officier de l'ordre militaire d'Avis (Morocco)
- Commandeur de l'Ordre du Nichan Iftikhar (Tunisia)
- Grand cordon de l'ordre de la République (Tunisia)
- Grand-croix de l'Ordre du Lion et du Soleil (Iran)
- Grand officier de l'ordre du Léopard (Zaïre)
- Grand officier de l'Ordre de l'Étoile équatoriale (Gabon)
- Grand officier de l'ordre du Léopard (Democratic Republic of the Congo)
- Grand officier de l'ordre du Mérite (Central Africa)
- Grand officier de l'ordre national du Mono (Togo)
- Grand-croix de l'ordre national (Haute-Volta)
- Commandeur de l'ordre national (Mali)
- Grand-croix de l'ordre national du Mérite (Madagascar)
- Grand-croix de l'ordre royal de Sahametrei (Cambodia)
- Grand-croix de l'ordre de Mai du Mérite Naval (Argentina)
- Ordre de l'Aigle Aztèque (Mexico)
- Grand-croix de l'ordre du Mérite Naval (Peru)
- Grand-croix de l'Ordre équestre du Saint-Sépulcre de Jérusalem (Holy See, Vatican)
- Chevalier de Grâce magistrale de l'ordre souverain de Malte
- Grand-croix du Mérite militaire de l'ordre de Malte with sword

== See also ==
- List of submarines of France
- List of French paratrooper units
- 1500 tons-class submarines
- Jean-Marie Querville
