= Météo-France =

National meteorological and climatological service of France

Department overview
- Formed: 18 June 1993; 33 years ago
- Jurisdiction: France (Note: Includes overseas territories and collectivites)
- Headquarters: 73, avenue de Paris, Saint-Mandé; 42, avenue Gaspard-Coriolis, Toulouse
- Employees: 2735 (as of 2020)
- Minister responsible: Christophe Béchu, Ministry of Ecological Transition and Cohesion of Territories
- Parent department: Ministry of Ecological Transition and Cohesion of Territories
- Website: meteofrance.com

Météo-France is the official French meteorological administration, also offering services to Andorra and Monaco. It has the powers of the state and can exercise them in relation to meteorology. Météo-France is in charge of observing, studying, and forecasting weather and monitoring snowpack. The organization also issues weather warnings for the Metropole and the overseas territories. Météo-France is also in charge of recording and predicting the climate.

== Organisation ==
The organisation was established by decree in June 1993 and is a department of the Ministry of Transportation. It is headquartered in Paris but many domestic operations have been decentralised to Toulouse. Its budget of around €300 million is funded by state grants, aeronautic royalties and sale of commercial services.

Météo-France has a particularly strong international presence, and is the French representative at the World Meteorological Organization. The organisation is a leading member of EUMETSAT, responsible for the procurement of Meteosat weather satellites. It is also member of the Institut au service du spatial, de ses applications et technologies. It is also a critical national weather service member of the ECMWF and hosts one of two major centres of the IFS numerical weather prediction model widely used worldwide.

== Worldwide ==
In addition to its operations in metropolitan France, the agency provides forecasts and warnings for the French overseas départements and collectivités. It has four sub-divisions based in Martinique (with further divisions serving Guadeloupe and French Guiana), New Caledonia, French Polynesia and Réunion. Some of these sub-divisions have particularly important international responsibilities:

- For example, the French Guiana office, based at Cayenne–Félix Eboué Airport, maintains facilities at the ESA/CNES Centre Spatial Guyanais spaceport in Kourou which assists with launch campaigns of the Ariane rocket.
- The RSMC La Réunion sub-division is the official World Meteorological Organisation designated Regional Specialized Meteorological Centre (RSMC) for the provision of forecasts and warnings of tropical cyclones in the south-west Indian Ocean.
- The French Polynesia sub-division, whilst not the official RSMC for tropical cyclones in the South Pacific, has been mandated by the WMO to issue forecasts and warnings of tropical cyclones for the neighbouring British Pitcairn Islands.

== Naming ==
Although the original name of the organisation was "Météo-France", with acute accents and normal French capitalisation, its branding is stylized METEO-FRANCE. This trademark decision reflects the need to have its name not altered in electronic documents due to transcoding errors, and to allow easier international references in many languages, including when referencing the organisation itself (in copyright notices, for example, or when citing sources).

The name, whether fully capitalized or with normal capitalisation with accents, is protected internationally both under trademark law and as an organisation name. Some non-binding information documents sometimes forget the hyphen (which normally is required).

== Services ==
Météo-France has a warning system to inform the population of dangerous weather conditions.

Météo-France heat alert, part of its vigilance system, was put in place following the 2003 European heat wave. The 2022 heat wave was the earliest in the year since records began and marked the fourth time that a red heat alert had been issued since the protocol was activated after the 2003 heat wave.

== See also ==
- EUMETSAT (international European organisation)
