= Hervé Renaudeau =

French professor and aerospace engineer

- Born: 1950s Laval, France
- Citizenship: French
- Education: Aerospace engineer
- Alma mater: École centrale de Lyon
- Known for: Former Director-General of the École supérieure des techniques aéronautiques et de construction automobile and of the Institut polytechnique des sciences avancées
- Predecessor: Aimé Merran
- Successor: Francis Pollet
- Children: 2 children

Hervé Renaudeau (born 1950s in Laval) is a French professor and aerospace engineer. From September 2009 to August 2016, he has been the director-general of the Institut polytechnique des sciences avancées (French private aerospace university).

== Biography ==
Graduate from the École centrale de Lyon (promotion 1979), Hervé Renaudeau began his career as a hardware design engineer on the Mirage 2000 autopilot from 1980 to 1981, then as a simulator design engineer for company Crouzet (1981–1984). After that, he worked until 1999 at Digital in Annecy as a project manager, networks and hardware consultant. Business Manager at Atos Origin from 1999 to 2001, he manages Unilog Management, a consulting group, up to 2002. Then, Hervé Renaudeau joined the École supérieure des techniques aéronautiques et de construction automobile at Levallois-Perret, and created the second campus of the university in Laval. In September 2009, he was appointed head of the Institut Polytechnique des Sciences Avancées. He left from the job in August 2016.

== Bibliography ==
- Académie nationale de l'air et de l'espace and Lucien Robineau, Les français du ciel, dictionnaire historique, Le Cherche midi, June 2005, 782 p. (ISBN 2-7491-0415-7)
