= Francis Pollet =

French professor and general officer

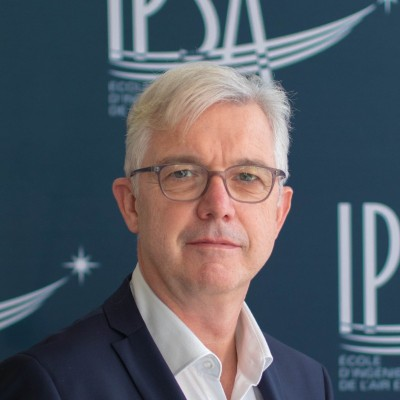
- Born: 5 May 1964 (age 62); Roubaix
- Citizenship: French
- Education: Fighter pilot
- Alma mater: École de l'air
- Known for: Director-General of the École de l'air and of the Institut polytechnique des sciences avancées
- Predecessor: Hervé Renaudeau
- Successor: Valérie Cornetet
- Children: 3

Francis Pollet (born 5 May 1964 at Roubaix) is a French professor and General officer. From March 2017 to the 30th of June 2022, he is the director-general of the Institut polytechnique des sciences avancées (French private aerospace university).

== Biography ==
Graduate from the École de l'air (promotion 1985), Francis Pollet started his career as a fighter pilot and cargo pilot where he performed more than 100 missions. Then, he became pilot for the French government and more specifically for the Prime Minister Lionel Jospin and the President Jacques Chirac on Dassault Falcon 900 and Airbus Corporate Jet.

After that, he has done a 15-year career in human resources and operational activities. He has been aeronautical advisory for 4 Ministry of Defense (Hervé Morin, Alain Juppé, Gérard Longuet and Jean-Yves Le Drian).

On 1 September 2003, he is nominated general director of the École de l'air where he managed the digital transformation by creating the MOOC in air defense. In March 2017, he becomes CEO of the Institut Polytechnique des Sciences Avancées, a French grande école in aeronautical and space engineering. He leaves the College on 30 June 2022. Valérie Cornetet takes the position of CEO of the College.

Francis Pollet is General officer.

== Bibliography ==
- Académie nationale de l'air et de l'espace and Lucien Robineau, Les français du ciel, dictionnaire historique, Le Cherche midi, June 2005, 782 p. (ISBN 2-7491-0415-7)
- Le futur de l'avion : Les prochains défis de l’industrie aéronautique, Ivry-sur-Seine, FYP Éditions, 2020, 160 p. (ISBN 978-2-36405-203-1)

== Distinctions ==
- National Order of Merit
- Aeronautical Medal
- Legion of Honour
- National Defence Medal
- Overseas Medal
