= German trawler V 406 Hans Loh =

German fishing trawler and naval trawler

History

Germany
- Name: 1936: Hans Loh; Sept 1939: V-402; Oct 1939: V-406
- Owner: Grundmann & Gröschel
- Operator: 1939: (Nazi Germany) Kriegsmarine
- Port of registry: 1936: (Nazi Germany) Wesermünde
- Builder: DeSchiMAG Seebeck, Wesermünde
- Yard number: 565
- Launched: 23 November 1936
- Completed: 7 January 1937
- Commissioned: into Kriegsmarine: 17 September 1939
- Identification: 1936: port letter and number PG 509; call sign DFCQ; 1939: pennant number V-402; 1939: pennant number V-406
- Fate: Sunk by mine, 18 August 1942

General characteristics
- Type: fishing trawler
- Tonnage: 464 GRT, 169 NRT
- Length: 163.3 ft (49.8 m)
- Beam: 26.4 ft (8.0 m)
- Draught: 13 ft 7 in (4.15 m)
- Depth: 13.3 ft (4.1 m)
- Installed power: 1 × triple-expansion engine; 1 × exhaust steam turbine; 96 NHP
- Propulsion: 1 × shaft; 1 × screw
- Speed: 12 knots (22 km/h)
- Sensors & processing systems: wireless direction finding; echo sounding device
- Notes: sister ship: Franz Dankworth

The German trawler V 406 Hans Loh was a steam trawler that became a Vorpostenboot (patrol boat) in the Second World War. She was launched in Germany in 1936 as Hans Loh. In September 1939 she was converted into the Vorpostenboot V-402. That October she was renumbered V-206. A mine sank her in the Gironde estuary in August 1942, killing 18 members of her crew.

== Building and registration ==
In 1936–37 Deutsche Schiff- und Maschinenbau (DeSchiMAG) built a pair of trawlers at its Seebeck shipyard in Wesermünde, Bremerhaven for the fishing fleet of Grundmann & Gröschel. Yard number 560 was launched as Franz Dankworth, and completed in 1936. Her sister ship was built as yard number 565; launched on 23 November 1936 as Hans Loh; and completed on 7 January 1937.

Hans Loh had the same specifications as Franz Dankworth. Her registered length was 163.3 ft (49.8 m); her beam was 26.4 ft (8.0 m); and her depth was 13.3 ft (4.1 m). Her draught was 13 ft 7 in (4.15 m). Her tonnages were 464 GRT and 169 NRT. She had a cruiser stern, and a single screw. She was equipped with wireless direction finding, and an echo sounding device.

DeSchiMAG also built her engines. Her main engine was a three-cylinder triple-expansion engine. It was supplemented by an exhaust steam turbine, which drove the same propeller shaft via DeSchiMAG's patent Bauer-Wach system of a Föttinger fluid coupling and double-reduction gearing. The combined power of her reciprocating engine plus exhaust turbine was rated at 96 NHP, and gave her a speed of 12 knots (22 km/h).

Grundmann & Gröschel registered Hans Loh at Wesermünde. Her port letter and number were PG 509, and her wireless telegraph call sign was DFCQ.

== Vorpostenboot ==
The Kriegsmarine requisitioned Hans Loh on 17 September 1939; had her converted into a Vorpostenboot, and commissioned her as V-402. She served in the 4. Vorpostenflottille ("4th Patrol Boat Flotilla"), which operated in the North Sea. On 16 October 1939 she was renumbered V-406. After France capitulated to Germany, the flotilla was transferred to the Bay of Biscay; mainly Bordeaux and Bayonne.

On 18 August 1942, V-406 steamed north up the coast from Arcachon to Royan with V 407 Dorum and V 411 Saarland. As the three trawlers entered the Gironde Estuary, V-406 struck a mine that the French submarine Rubis had laid, and sank at position 45°02′N 1°32.7′W. V-411 rescued 24 members of V-406's crew, but one died shortly afterward. V-411 landed survivors at Royan. In total, 18 members of V-406's crew were killed.

== Bibliography ==
- Gröner, Erich (1993). Die deutschen Kriegsschiffe 1815–1945 (in German). Vol. 8: Flußfahrzeuge, Ujäger, Vorpostenboote, Hilfsminensucher, Küstenschutzverbände (Teil 1). Koblenz: Bernard & Graefe. ISBN 3-7637-4807-5.
- Lloyd's Register of Shipping. Vol. II.–Steamers and Motorships of 300 tons: trawlers, tugs, dredgers, &c. London: Lloyd's Register of Shipping. 1938 – via Southampton City Council.
