= École navale =

French Naval Academy in Lanvéoc-Poulmic, Brittany, France

Coordinates: 48.2792°N 4.415°W

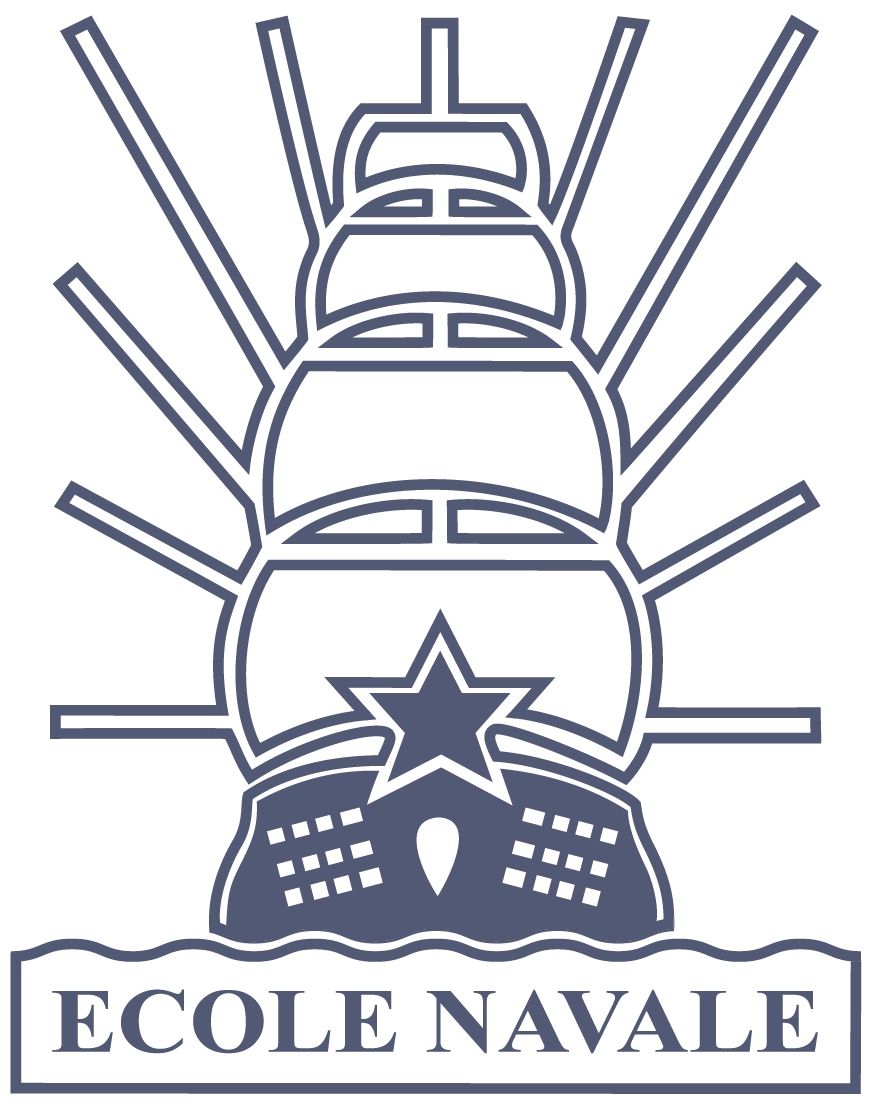
- Motto: Pour la France, par les mers, nous combattons (French)
- Motto in English: For France, by the seas, we fight
- Type: Military college, grande école, engineering school
- Established: 1830; 196 years ago
- Affiliations: Conférence des Grandes écoles; Conference of the Directors of French Engineering Schools; European University of Brittany
- Head: Rear admiral Philippe Hello
- Administrative staff: 270 military, 30 civilians
- Students: 1,500 each year
- Location: Lanvéoc-Poulmic, Brittany, France
- Campus: Naval Base of Lanvéoc-Poulmic
- Colors: Blue; White
- Website: ecole-navale.fr

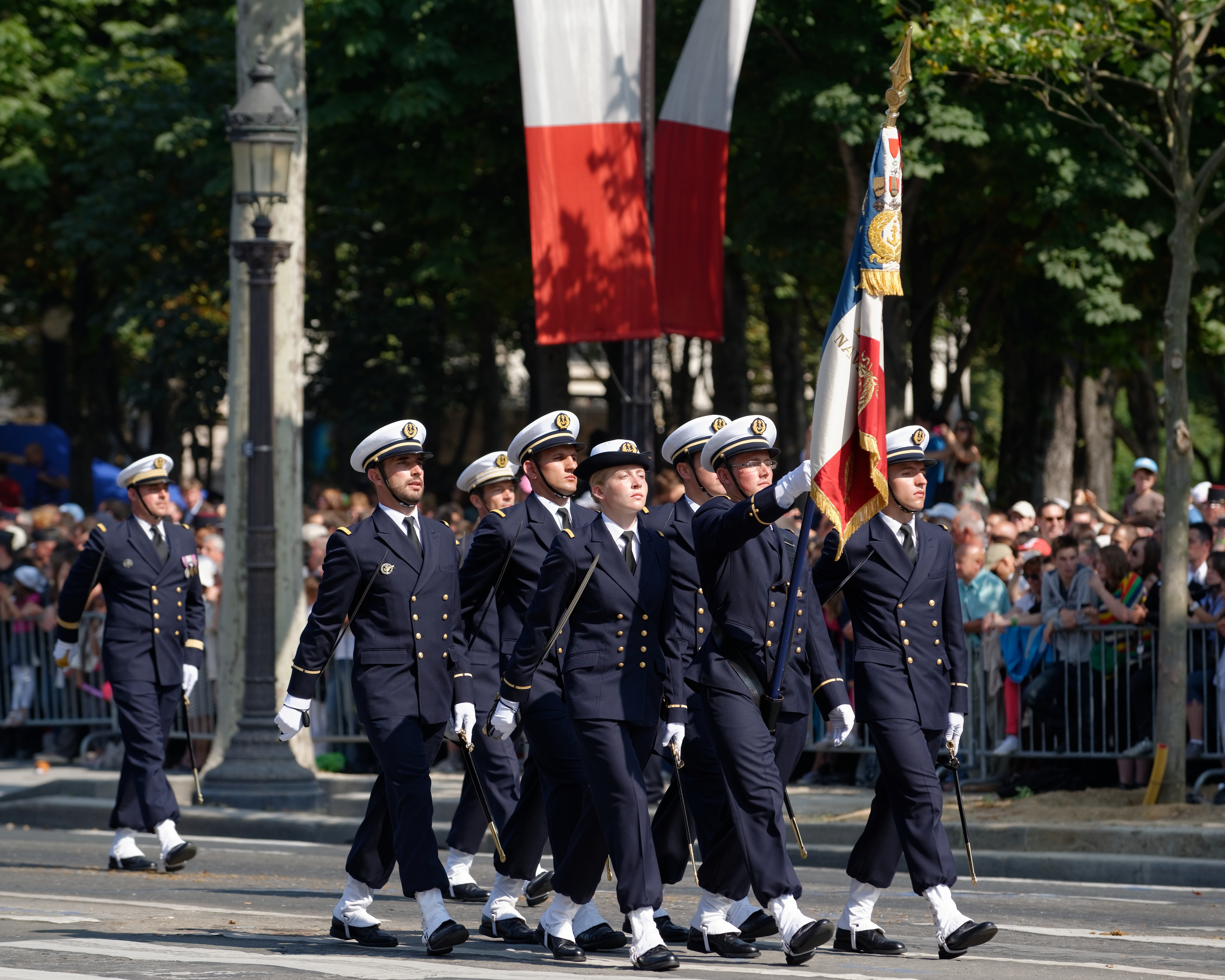
Students from the École navale in their school uniforms during the Bastille Day military parade.

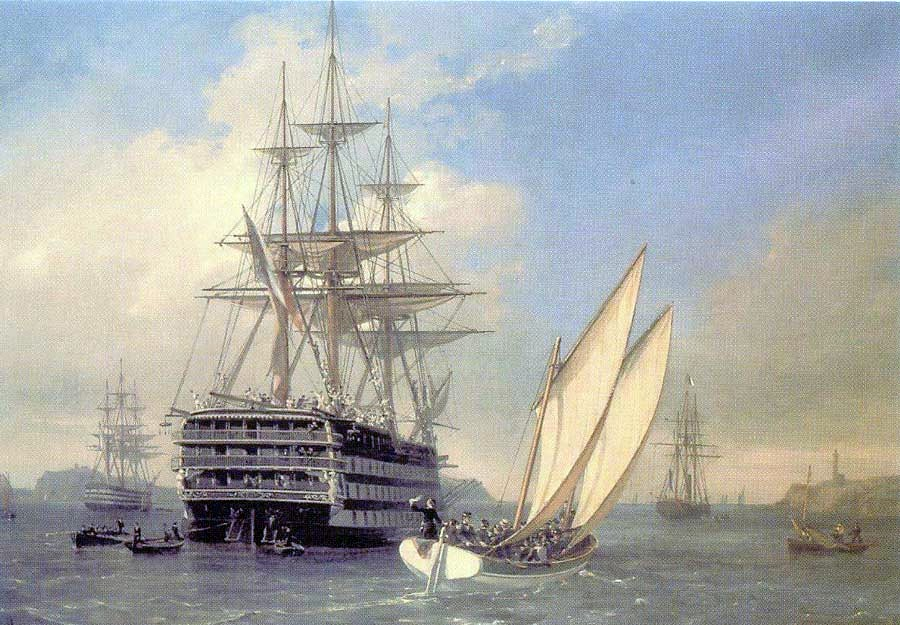
The French ship Borda, where the École navale was located from 1864 to 1890

The École navale (French pronunciation: [ekɔl naval]) is the French naval academy, in charge of the education of the officers of the French Navy. They are educated at the academy for responsibilities onboard surface ships and submarines, in French Naval Aviation, with the fusiliers marins and commandos, and on the general staff. It is also an engineering school, delivering a full scientific and technical curriculum as part of its officer training.

The École navale and its research institute (IRENAV) are in Lanvéoc-Poulmic, south of the roadstead of Brest.

== History ==
The academy was founded in 1830, by order of King Louis-Philippe. Originally the academy was based on ships, anchored in the harbour of Brest, such as the Borda (previously named Valmy), hence the nickname of "Bordache" given to the students.

In 1914, the École navale was transferred ashore in Brest. The school was destroyed by Allied bombing raids during World War II, and was moved to nearby Lanvéoc-Poulmic, on the opposite side of the bay of Brest (Rade de Brest). The academy remained in this location after the war, and was officially inaugurated by Charles de Gaulle in 1965.

=== The successive Borda of the École navale ===
The École navale, created in 1830, was originally located onboard vessels harboured in Brest, almost all of which were nicknamed Borda (from the name of Jean-Charles de Borda, a famous French scientist of the 18th century). The first vessel to house the École Navale was named Orion; it was then replaced in 1840 by the Commerce-de-Paris, a wooden, three-decked ship. This ship had an inappropriate name for a naval academy, so it was renamed Borda. In 1863, the academy was transferred to the Valmy (the second Borda), then, in 1890, to the Intrépide (the third Borda), and in 1913, to the Duguay-Trouin (1879), which had been a school vessel for those applying to the Navy between 1900 and 1912. With the exceptions of the Orion and the Duguay-Trouin, each of these vessels was still christened as Borda. In honor of its maritime origins, today's official logo of the Naval School features the Borda with her sails, keeping alive the traditions of its rich past.

=== École navale traditions on the Borda ===
==== The welcoming ceremony ====
The new cadets are boarded from the pontoon Gueydon, one day before the senior classmen. Crammed like sheep in a gunboat, they were bouncy and happy while launching a goodbye to their families. As soon as arrived, they were sorted, numbered, undressed in order to give them the white blouse and linen trousers. Their hair was also shorn.

Two days later, the parents were authorised onboard for the opening mass for the new cadets. Flags were placed around the altar, and a single seat was reserved for the "Pope", the nickname of the captain commanding the academy. The parents took place on bench, and then the pupils entered, the senior ones first, tiding themselves on the sides, and then the new cadets in their new suit under the quip of the others who were screaming "Caillou! Caillou!" (Stone! Stone!) to recognize the new cadets. This was followed by the first formal dinner of the new students.

==== Traditions ====
A traditional ceremony onboard the Borda was the presentation and delivery of the sword to the son by his "baille" father, for the first day of outing; the son knelt and kissed the sword's blade as if he were being knighted.

In the spring, when the first outing in dinghy occurred, another consecration took place, this of baptism of the new cadets by the senior cadets of the academy, as the latter throw water buckets upon the former.

==== Slang at "La Baille" ====
The École navale is traditionally called "La Baille" (and not "Navale", which instead refers to the old school of Health of Bordeaux). Its jargon is rich and comes principally from maritime slang. Like every "Grande Ecole", the jargon is wide-used among its student body. For example, the commander in second is the "widow". The elephants, or the "pékins", are the civilians; the "bordache", or the "type-baille", is the student. The "chafustard" is the mechanic; and the mastiffs are the subofficers assuring the military surrounding. Finally, the songs of the board are often crude, but of high musical and literary standard. Nowadays, the student body uses some expressions coming from other military academies (École Polytechnique, École Spéciale Militaire de Saint-Cyr, École de l'air) and from military high schools. The standard reference book about the jargon at "La Baille" was written by Commander Roger Coindeau, and illustrated by Luc-Marie Bayle.

==== Learning the work of seaman ====
All this will not impede the future Navy officers to work hard in both education and practical skills. Since the opening of the academy during the first weeks of the academic year the senior classes - in the days when the academy was at sea - would accompany the 4th classmen in climbing the shrouds, and make them do the recovery in order to enter in the hune. It is the first step. Then comes the climbing of the second hune, and little by little, everyone gets accustomed not to have dizziness, but to run on the footboard stretched beneath each yardarm, to unfurl the sail. All this is commanded by a whistle. Even if the job of topsman had become unuseful with the modern war boats, it was still taught to the student-officers, in order for them to be able to bring back a catch in time of war with its sails, and also because it was part of the old traditions of the French Navy.

The two years of school were well filled up with everything that a Navy officer had to learn: rowing, sailing, the machines, armed drill and weapons instruction, combat training aboard or onshore, signal flags, vessel maintenance, superior mathematics, geography, hydrography, English language, and a lot more. At the 3rd year of studies, the 2nd classmen left the Borda for their training cruises to various parts of the world.

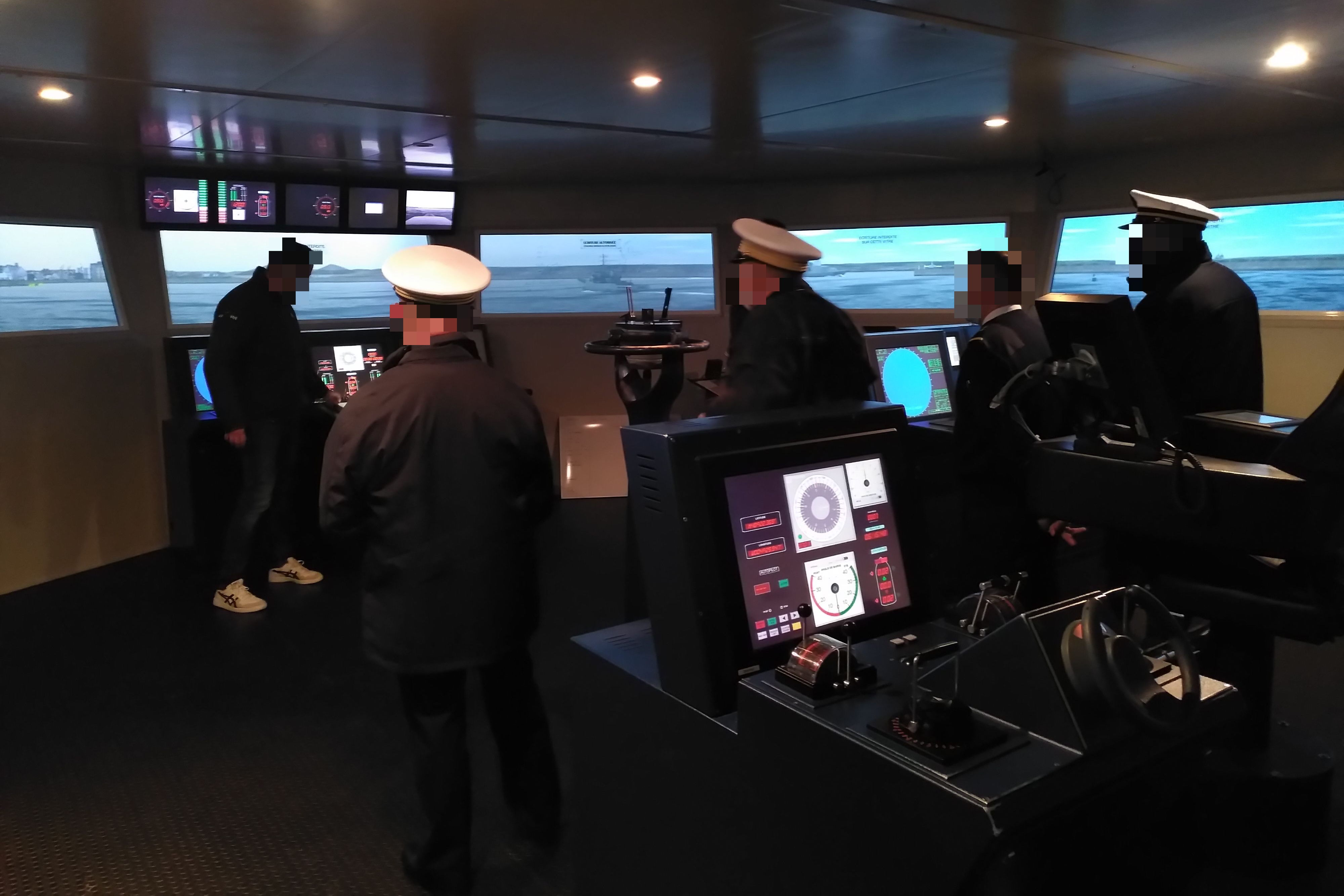
Navigation simulator of the École navale in 2021

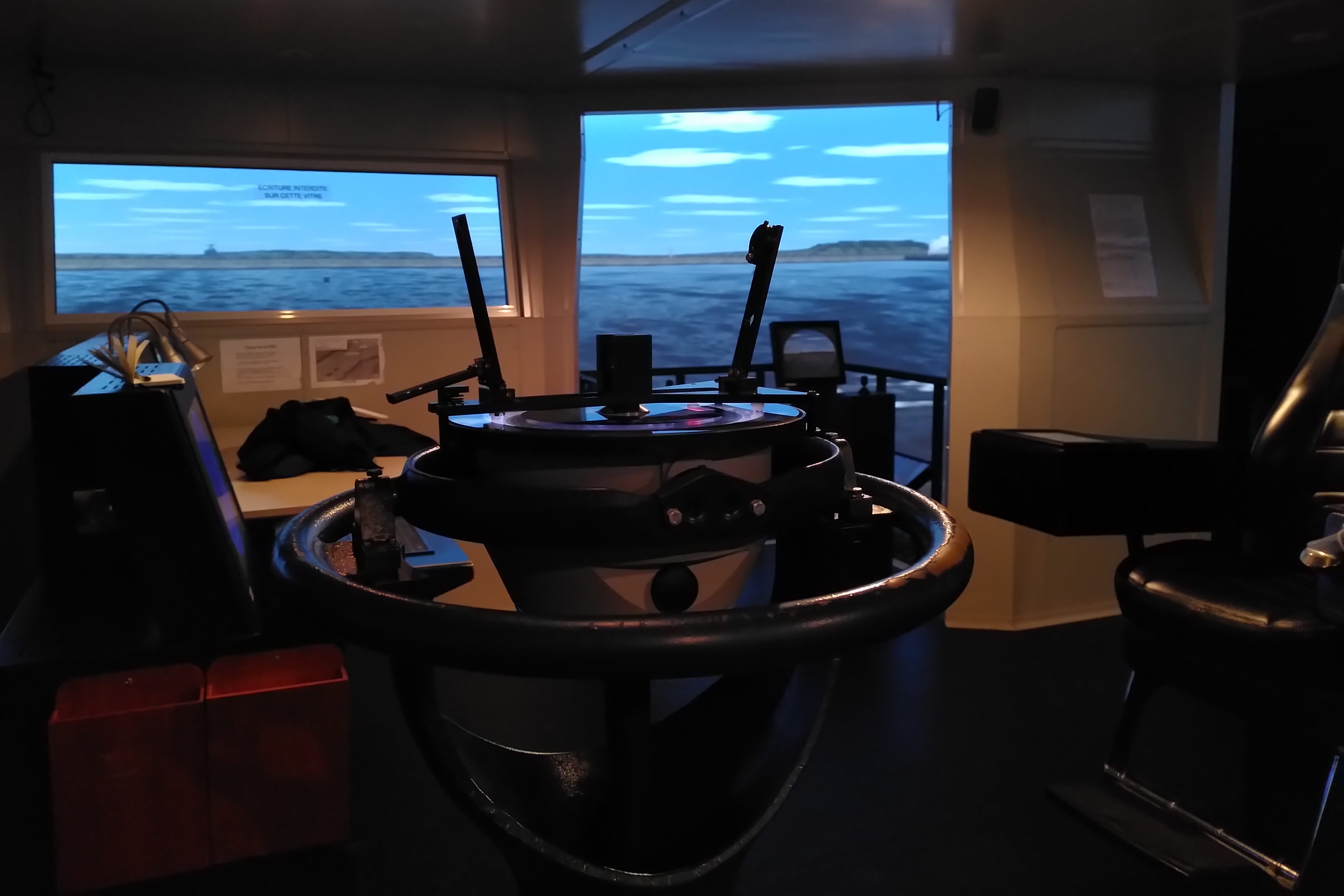
Navigation simulator of the École navale in 2021

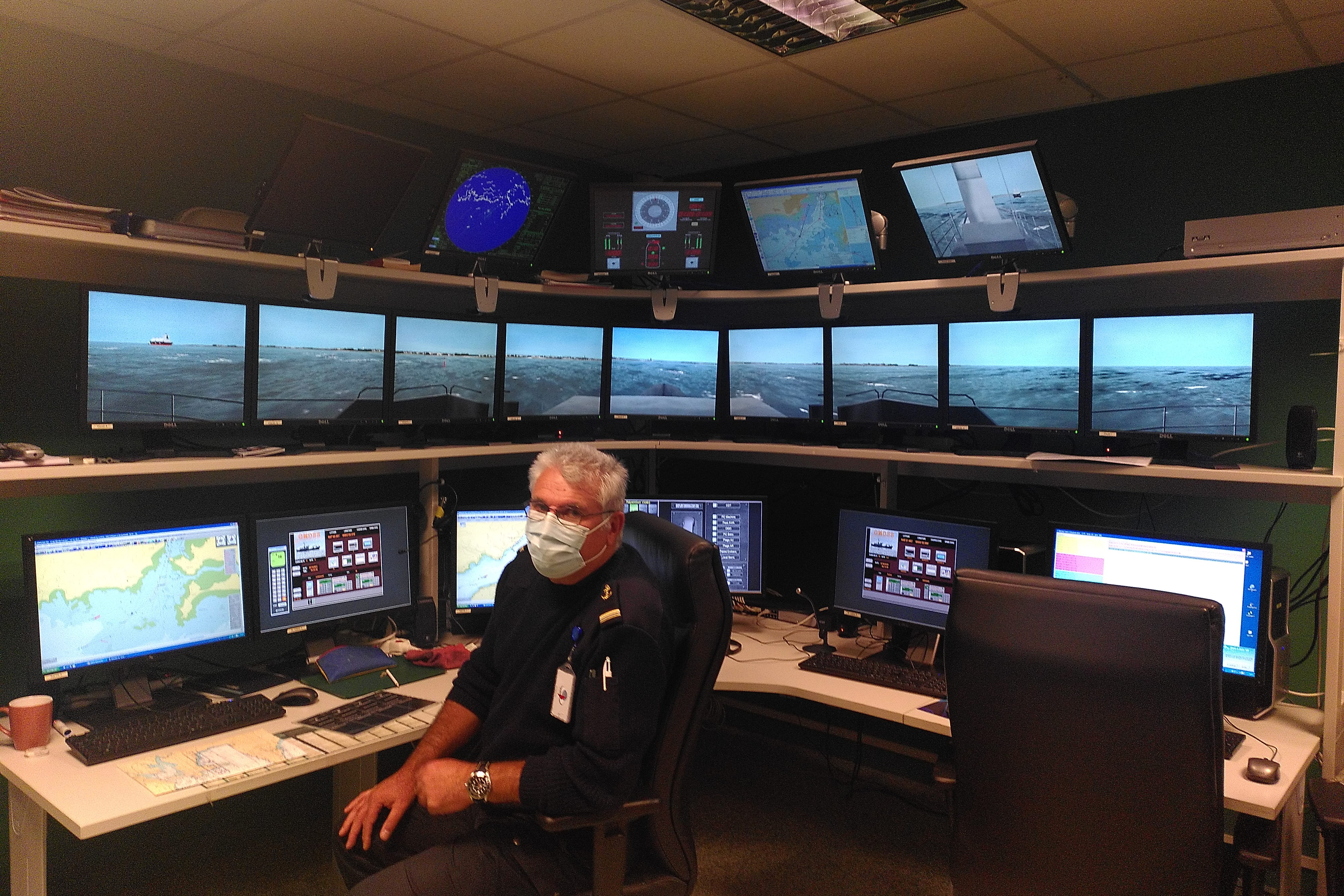
Control room of the simulator

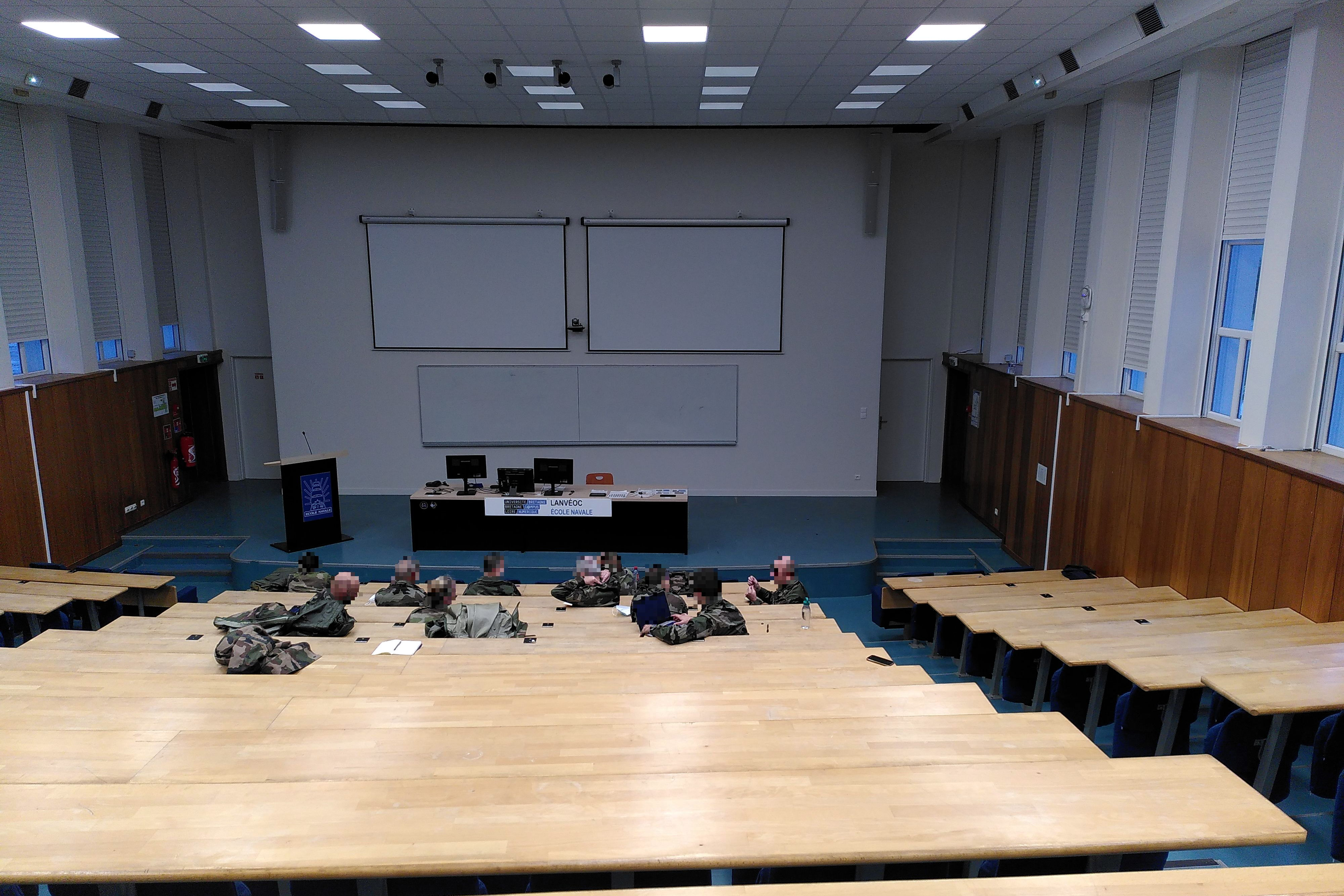
One of the auditoriums of the academy

==== The École navale back to the ground ====
In the beginning of the 20th century, a project to move the Ecole Naval, to the ground, had almost made its way. The chosen place was at la Pointe, in the district of Recouvrance (Brest). The project failed due to a lack of money. However the school settled in 1915 in buildings already built in Laninon, also situated in Recouvrance, as the First World War was then raging.

Work for the campus began November 14, 1929 and was presided by Georges Leygues, minister of the Navy, and the school was inaugurated on 30 May 1936 by Albert Lebrun, President of the Republic.

Regardless of the grounding of the school, the final year of formation and training at sea (the School of Application) has been preserved in the form of traditional cruising (sometimes around the world), onboard of successive Jeanne d'Arc ships: the cruisers Jeanne d'Arc (1899), then Jeanne d'Arc (1930) and finally the helicopter carrier Jeanne d'Arc, until 2010.

As of today the later "Mission Jeanne d'Arc" cruises by the cadets have been done in various vessels of the Navy.

In 1945, the important destructions suffered by the École navale during the Second World War did not allow it to welcome the student officers in normal conditions. The school was transferred to provisory barracks at the Lanveoc aeronautical base instead, and new buildings were proposed in the late 1950s to accommodate a rising number of naval cadets. The definitive buildings of the new École Navale at its current campus were inaugurated in 1965 by General De Gaulle. The old École navale of Saint-Pierre-Quilbignon is now known as the Naval Instruction Center which hosts the Lycée naval, the École de maistrance and the (currently reopened) École des Mousses.

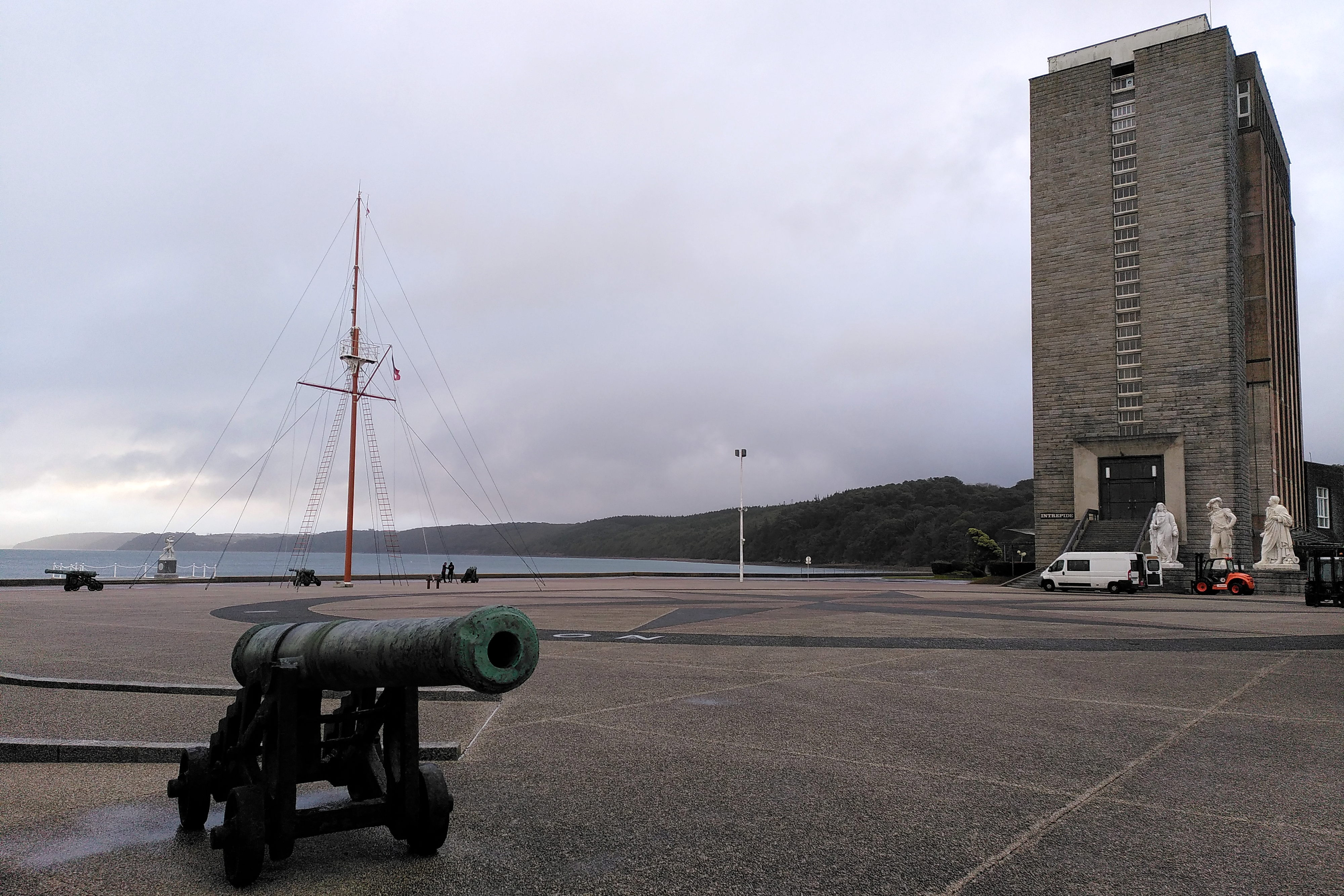
The place-of-arms and the Intrépide tower

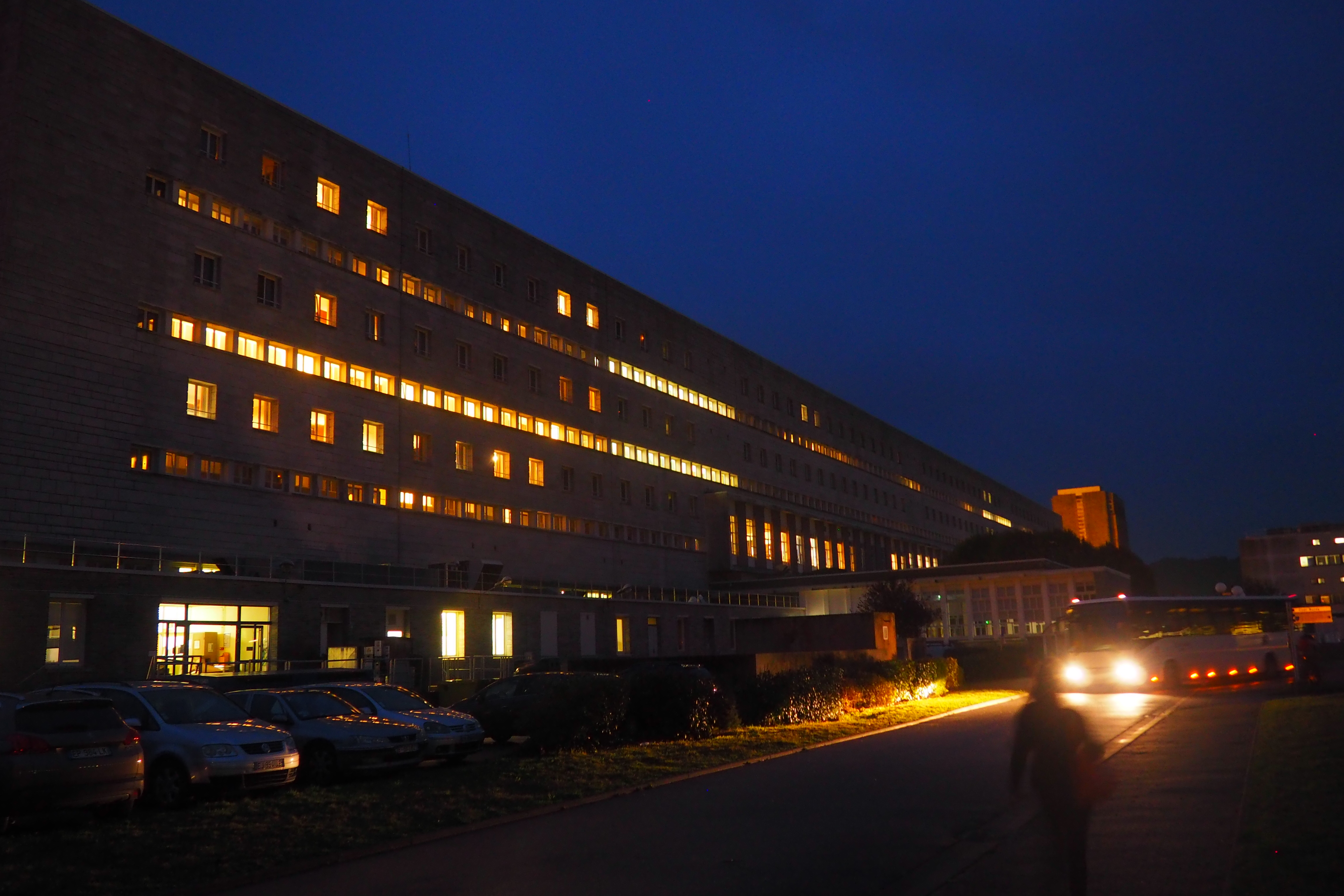
Building Orion

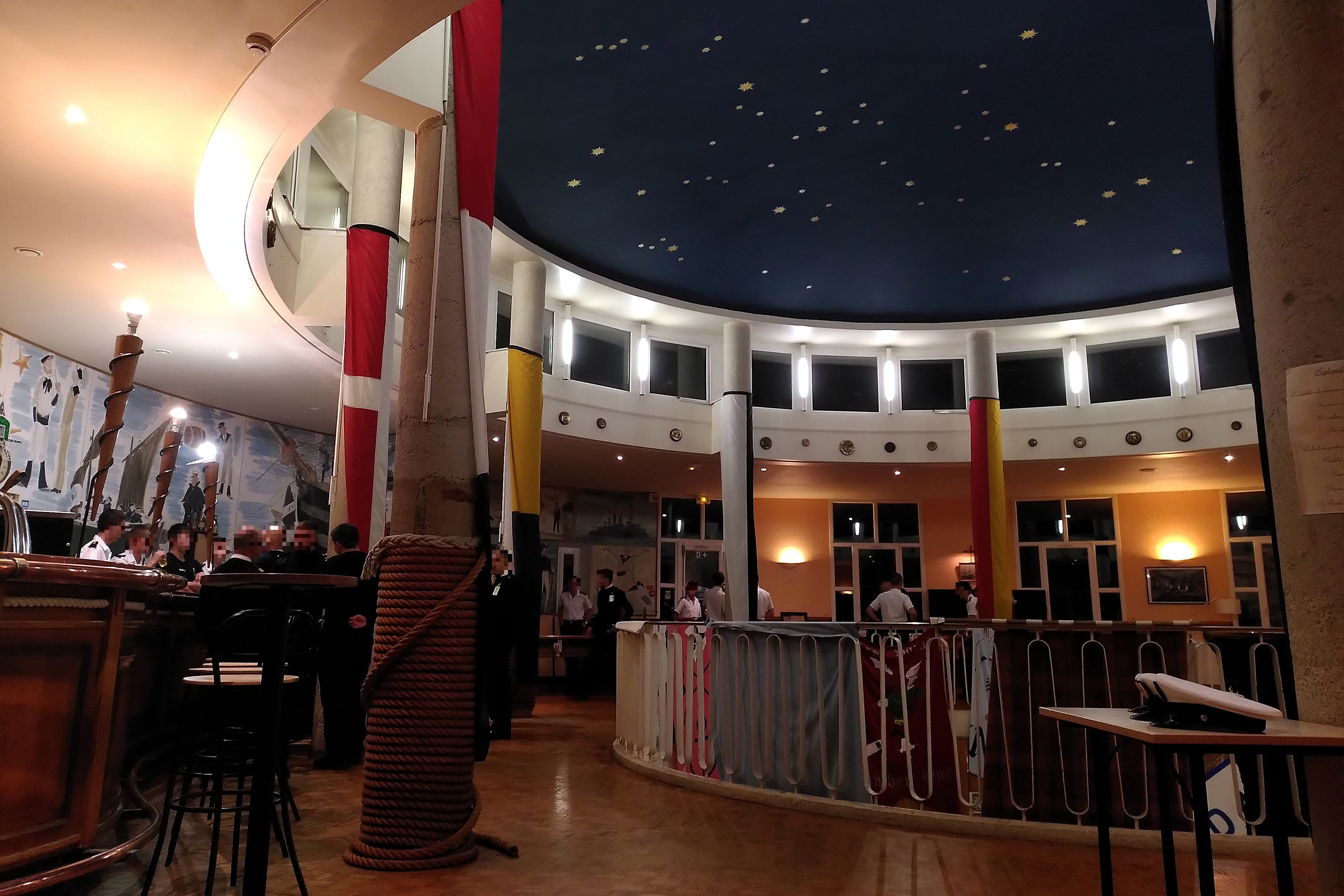
The pub Borda

== Officer stream ==
As all officers obtain a college major upon graduation, military and leadership education is nested with academic instruction. The Naval School operates one three-year and a one year program each depending on the midshipman's option.

=== Engineer degree ===
The engineer degree is a degree that is awarded following three years of post-high education. Since 2009, l'École navale has adapted it to fully comply with the European education system. The students are recruited by a competitive exam after two or three years of preparatory mathematics classes. The programme consists in 6 semesters (or 360 credits, per the ECTS):

- Semester 1: maritime and military elementary formation;
- Semester 2: scientific common-core syllabus;
- Semester 3: scientific options and International relations;
- Semester 4: additional scientific study and "environment of the French Defence";
- Semester 5: end of degree project;
- Semester 6: sea application campaign.

In their second year, students rank as aspirant, and as commissioned enseigne de vaisseau de deuxième classe in the third year. Upon completion of their studies, they are awarded a Master's Degree in engineering. This degree is recognised by the Commission des Titres d'Ingénieur, the French accreditation body for engineers.

After this training, they go on to study "maritime superior warfare and specialisation", and they are ranked Enseigne de vaisseau de première classe, or Ensign first class, equivalent to Lieutenant, j.g. or Sublieutenant.

=== Under contract officer stream ===
The officer formation stream is followed by the "under contract officers". This officer initial formation is given at the École navale. Its target is to give to this young graduate, of the superior education of diversified origins, a maritime, military culture and an engineer formation. The course runs for a year.

It is attested by the attribution for:

- the navy officer of the "operations lead" stream by the certificate of "bridge watch leader" which is the international certificate STCW*95;
- The navy officer of the "energy and propulsion" stream by the certificate of "engine watch leader";

At the end of that year, the midshipmen are given the rank of ensign, and they are sent to follow the "maritime superior formation and specialization" (see underneath).

== Notable alumni ==
- Anne-Ségolène Abscheidt, professor and naval engineer
- Pierre Savorgnan de Brazza, Italian-French explorer
- Henri Bretonnet, naval officer
- Jacques-Yves Cousteau, naval officer, oceanographer, filmmaker and author
- François Darlan, French admiral and politician
- Félix du Temple, naval officer and inventor
- Émile Gentil, naval officer
- Matila Ghyka, Romanian naval officer
- Paul Groussac, French-Argentine writer
- Joseph Le Brix, naval officer and aviator
- Paul-Louis-Félix Philastre, French diplomat
- Didier Ratsiraka, former President of Madagascar
- Henri Rivière, French naval officer and writer
- Michel Serres, philosopher and writer
- Éric Tabarly, naval officer and navigator
- Philippe Tailliez, naval officer and writer
