= Brest Naval Training Centre =

Coordinates: 48.37036°N 4.52665°W

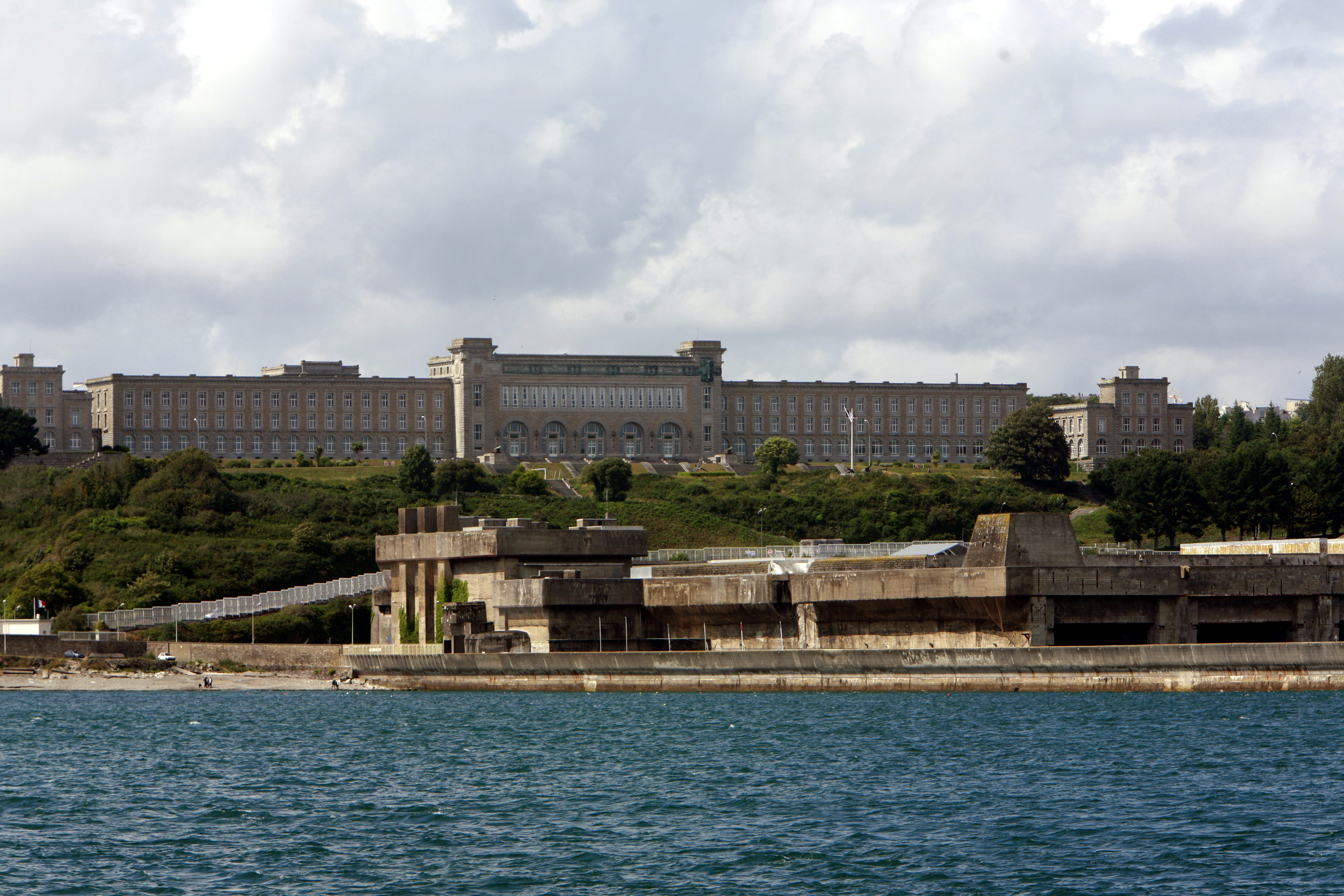
- Building of the École de maistrance in Brest
- Type: Military college
- Location: Brest Naval Base, France

The Brest Naval Training Centre (the Centre d'instruction naval de Brest, or CIN) is one of the main training centres for the French Navy. Housed in the Brest naval base, the CIN is made up of the lycée naval (a lycée that also prepares students to enter France's officer-training schools), the École de maistrance (training future naval non-commissioned officers) and the seamen's training school.

== The environment ==
The Naval Instruction Centre groups the Lycée Naval (a naval high school), the École de Maistrance (training the future Navy's sub-officers) and the École des Mousses (seaman's school). This centre is above the Naval base.

== Lycée Naval ==
The lycée naval was created in 1966 as collège naval. It is one of France's six military high schools under custody of the French ministry of Defence. The school has two missions: to help the families and to help the Navy's recruitment.

The lycée naval is divided in two parts separated for the teaching:

- The "Lycée" (high school), which groups the three French years of high school in two specialties of general teaching: sciences and a section about social and economics.
- The preparatory classes with the principal aim to prepare the students for the admission exams for officers in the Navy, Army and Air Force. But also the preparatory class to superior studies which has a level superior to the A-Level but not as hard as the preparatory classes.

=== History ===
Date	Événement
1966	Creation of the naval college
1980	The College becomes Lycée naval.
1983	Co-education in the secondary classes
1992	Opening of the eco and social section
1993	Co-education in the preparatory classes
2004	Opening of the engineering sciences section

=== Admission's conditions ===
- The recruitment for the first year of high school is made by a written exam (maths, French and English/German). It is a common requirement for all military high schools apart from the Air Force.
- The recruitment for the preparatory classes is made upon results during the last year of High School.

== École de Maistrance ==
The École de maistrance (school of mastery) is the training school for future non-commissioned officers in the French Navy. It was set up in 1933 under this name, it is now part of the Brest Naval Training Centre and within the remit of the Direction du personnel militaire de la marine (DPPM). It is currently headed by capitaine de frégate Gabriel Steffe.

The school has an annual intake of up to 400 young people aged 18 to 25, from "bac à bac +2" level - on 14 July 2008, for example, it had 224 students in total, including 55 women. The initial course lasts 18 weeks, followed by 6 months' specialist training (3.5 years for medical students) and 3 weeks complementary training in management. Students wear the rank badge of a "second maître maistrancier" (equivalent to quartermaster, 1st class), with the blue stripes bordered in red, and become second maîtres on graduation.

In 1958 the École de maistrance received the banner of the École des mousses, decorated with the Légion d'honneur, the Croix de guerre 1914-1918, the Croix de guerre 1939-1945 and the Croix de guerre des Théâtres d'opérations extérieures.

== École des Mousses ==
The École des Mousses (Seaman's school) has a co-educational role of 240 each year. The school trains future sailors of the Marine nationale, the French navy. It was founded in 1856 by Napoleon III.

== Bibliography ==
- Guénégou, Yann (2 September 2024). "Rentrée scolaire : au lycée naval à Brest, c'est la vie militaire". actu.fr (in French).
- Le Monde de l'éducation (in French). S.A.R.L. Le Monde. 1994.
- Gautier, Sébastien (13 July 2016). Une si belle journée (in French). Les Éditions du Net. ISBN 978-2-312-04548-1.
- Bouvier, Claudia (23 March 2022). Codename Corvus Thriller: Band 1 Die Iskander - Verschwörung (in German). tredition. ISBN 978-3-347-47148-1.
- Lormier, Dominique (4 May 2016). Histoires extraordinaires de la Seconde Guerre mondiale (in French). Cherche Midi. ISBN 978-2-7491-4084-1.
- Weyl, Laurent (n.d.). "Ecole des mousses". library.panos.co.uk. Panos Pictures.
