= Institute of Space, its Applications and Technologies =

The Institut au service du spatial, de ses applications et technologies (ISSAT) (in English Institute of Space, its Applications and Technologies), is a French association supported by French Ministry of Education, created in 1995 in order to develop the aerospace activities in Toulouse and to help developing the knowledge of aerospace in France and Europe

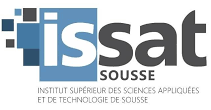
ISSAT Logo

== Members ==
The ISSAT has several physical members and 7 juridical person members:

- Centre national d'études spatiales (CNES);
- École nationale de l'aviation civile (ENAC);
- Institut national polytechnique de Toulouse (INPT);
- Institut polytechnique des sciences avancées (IPSA);
- Institut supérieur de l'aéronautique et de l'espace (ISAE-SUPAERO);
- Université Toulouse III Paul Sabatier (UT3).
