= Ingénieurs et scientifiques de France =

French national institution created in 1992

- Ingénieurs et scientifiques de France
- Conseil national des Ingénieurs et Scientifiques de France
- Nickname: IESF
- Formation: March 19, 1992; 34 years ago
- Type: Association of French engineers and scientists
- Legal status: (association law 1901)
- Purpose: Advocacy. National and International.
- Headquarters: 17 Rue Lamennais
- Location: Paris, France
- Method: Think Tank, commissions, working groups.
- Members: 180 alumni associations
- Official language: French
- Website: www.iesf.fr

The Ingénieurs et scientifiques de France (IESF), formerly known as the Conseil national des Ingénieurs et Scientifiques de France (CNISF), is a non-profit institution, apolitical and non-confessional, which aims to be representative in France and abroad of French engineers and scientists. It brings together more than 180 alumni association of engineering schools and around thirty engineering and scientific societies. It is present throughout France through 25 Regional Unions of Engineers and Scientists (regional IESF) as well as abroad. Through this, IESF has more than 160,000 direct and indirect members, and represents 800,000 engineers and scientists.

It is the national member for France of the World Federation of Engineering Organizations and of the European Federation of National Engineering Associations (FEANI).

It is governed by Aurélien Guez
