= French submarine Rubis (1931) =

Saphir-class minelaying submarine

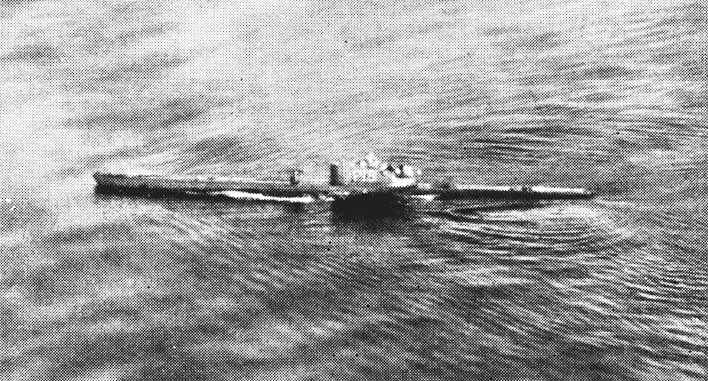
- Rubis in difficulty in a minefield off Norway

History

France
- Name: Rubis
- Namesake: Ruby
- Builder: Arsenal de Toulon
- Laid down: 3 April 1929
- Launched: 30 September 1931
- Commissioned: 4 April 1933
- Stricken: 4 October 1949
- Honours and awards: Ordre de la Libération
- Fate: Scuttled on 31 January 1958 to be used as sonar target

General characteristics
- Class & type: Saphir-class submarine
- Displacement: 761 long tons (773 t) (surfaced); 925 long tons (940 t) (submerged)
- Length: 65.9 m (216 ft)
- Beam: 7.1 m (23 ft)
- Draught: 4.3 m (14 ft)
- Installed power: 2 × 550 shp (410 kW) (electrical); 2 × 650 shp (480 kW) (diesel)
- Propulsion: 2 electrical engines; 2 diesel
- Speed: Surfaced: 12 knots (22 km/h; 14 mph); Underwater: 9 knots (17 km/h; 10 mph)
- Range: 7.000 nmi (12.964 km; 8.055 mi) at 7.5 knots (13.9 km/h; 8.6 mph); Submerged: 80 nmi (150 km; 92 mi) at 4 knots (7.4 km/h; 4.6 mph)
- Test depth: 80 m (260 ft)
- Complement: 42
- Armament: 3 × 550 mm (21.7 in) torpedo tubes; 2 × 400 mm (15.7 in) torpedo tubes; 1 × 75 mm (3 in) deck gun; 1 × 13.2 mm (0.52 in) machine gun; 2 × 8 mm (0.31 in) machine guns; 32 naval mines

The French submarine Rubis (H4, 202, P15) was a Saphir-class minelaying submarine which first served in the French submarine force, then the Free French Naval Forces (FNFL) during the Second World War and back with the French Navy. The boat was awarded numerous awards. Accordingly, as a result of Rubis's service with the FNFL, the boat was made a companion of the Ordre de la Libération by a decree issued by General Charles de Gaulle on 14 October 1941.

== Career ==
After serving in Toulon with the 7th and later 5th Submarine Squadrons, in 1937 Rubis was transferred to Cherbourg.

During the Norwegian campaign, in May 1940, Rubis laid mines off the Norwegian coast; the boat's mines claimed four Norwegian vessels in May and June, and a further three merchant ships in July. At the time of the French surrender on 22 June 1940, the boat was in the port of Dundee, Scotland in the United Kingdom, where the boat promptly joined the pavilion of the Free French Forces. At that time, she was commanded by Capitaine de Corvette Georges Cabanier.

Whilst minelaying off Norway in mid-1941, Rubis encountered and torpedoed a Finnish merchant ship. Later in the war, the boat laid mines in the Bay of Biscay, claiming three German auxiliary minesweepers, an armed trawler, and a Vichy French tugboat in 1942, and a fourth auxiliary minesweeper in 1943. Operating off Stavanger in September 1944, the boat's mines claimed two auxiliary submarine chasers and two merchant ships. In October and November, Rubis continued in Norwegian waters, damaging but not sinking two vessels. On 21 December, the boat's mines claimed three auxiliary submarine chasers, a German merchant ship, and a minesweeper.

Throughout the war, Rubis made 22 operational patrols, laying nearly 683 mines and sinking some 21,000 GRT of shipping. With 22 ships sunk (14 of them German, including 12 warships), Rubis achieved the highest kill number in the FNFL.

From 1946 to 1948, she was used as a school ship for rigging in Toulon.

Rubis was struck on 4 October 1949, and was sunk on 31 January 1958 to be used as a sonar target. The wreck lies 41 metres (135 ft) underwater between Cavalaire and Saint-Tropez, and has become a popular diving attraction.

=== Ships sunk or damaged ===
==== 1940 ====
- 26 May 1940: Norwegian transport Vansø (54 BRT) hits a mine laid on 10 May and sinks at 58°21′00″N 06°01′00″E
- 28 May 1940: Norwegian sail ship Blaamannen (174 BRT), from Haugesund, hits a mine laid on 27 May and sinks at 59°28′00″N 05°12′00″E
- 31 May 1940: Norwegian merchant ship Jadarland (938 BRT), from Haugesund, hits a mine laid on 27 May and sinks at 59°28′00″N 05°12′00″E
- 10 June 1940: Norwegian merchant ship Sverre Sigurdssøn (1,081 BRT) hits a mine laid on 9 June off Herdla and sinks at 60°36′00″N 04°55′00″E
- 7 July 1940: Norwegian merchant ship Almora (2,433 BRT), from Egersund, hits a mine laid on 10 May at 58°21′00″N 06°01′00″E. The ship survives.
- 24 July 1940: Norwegian merchant ship Kem (1,705 BRT), from Egersund, hits a mine laid on 10 May and sinks at 58°21′00″N 06°01′00″E.
- 28 July 1940: Norwegian merchant ship Argo (413 BRT), from Egersund, hits a mine laid on 10 May and sinks at 58°21′00″N 06°01′00″E.

==== 1941 ====
- 21 August 1941: Rubis torpedoes and sinks the Finnish merchant ship Hogland (4,360 BRT) off Norway at 58°27′00″N 05°46′00″E.

==== 1942 ====
- 31 March 1942: German submarine U-702 was sunk by a mine laid by the French submarine Rubis in position 56°34′00″N 06°16′00″E.
- 12 June 1942: German auxiliary minesweeper M 4212 (formerly Marie Frans), 125 BRT, hits a mine laid on 5 June and sinks at 43°37′00″N 01°34′00″W.
- 26 June 1942: Vichy French tugboat Quand Même (288 BRT) hits a mine laid on 5 June and sinks at 43°37′00″N 01°35′00″W.
- 10 July 1942: German auxiliary minesweeper M 4401 (formerly Imbrin), 339 BRT, hits a mine and sinks at 44°58′00″N 01°23′00″W.
- 18 August 1942: German Vorpostenboot V 406 (formerly Hans Loh), 464 BRT, hits a mine laid on 14 August and sinks at 45°03′00″N 01°34′00″W.
- 20 September 1942: German auxiliary minesweeper M 4448 (formerly: L 4148), 77 BRT, hits a mine laid on 5 June and sinks at 43°37′00″N 01°34′00″W.

==== 1943 ====
- 10 July 1943: German auxiliary minesweeper M 4451 (formerly Gauleiter A. Meyer), 652 BRT, hits a mine off Arcachon and sinks at 44°58′00″N 01°10′00″W.

==== 1944 ====
- 26 September 1944: German auxiliary submarine hunter UJ 1106 (formerly Grönland), 464 BRT, hits a mine laid on 24 September and sinks at 58°45′00″N 05°24′00″E.
- 27 September 1944:
  - German auxiliary submarine hunter UJ 1715 (formerly Lesum), 464 BRT, hits a mine laid on 24 September and sinks at 58°45′00″N 05°24′00″E
  - German merchant ship Cläre Hugo Stinnes 1 (5,295 BRT) hits a mine laid on 24 September and sinks at 58°45′00″N 05°24′00″E
  - Norwegian cargo ship Knute Nelson (5,749 BRT) hits a mine laid on 24 September and sinks at 58°45′00″N 05°24′00″E
- 27 October 1944: German Vorpostenboot V 5304 (formerly Seehund) hits a mine laid on 18 October at 60°55′00″N 04°40′00″E. The ship survives with heavy damage.
- 24 November 1944: Norwegian merchant ship Castor (1,683 BRT), from Egersund, hits a mine laid on the same day and sustain damage.
- 21 December 1944, off Norway:
  - German cargo ship Weichselland (formerly Latvian Gundega), 3,654 BRT, hits a mine laid on 19 December and sinks
  - German auxiliary submarine hunter UJ 1113 / KUJ 7, 970 BRT, hits a mine laid on 19 December and sinks
  - German auxiliary submarine hunter UJ 1116 / KUJ 11, 970 BRT, hits a mine laid on 19 December and sinks
  - German auxiliary submarine hunter UJ 1702 / KUJ 16, 970 BRT, hits a mine laid on 19 December and sinks
  - German minesweeper R 402, 140 t, hits a mine laid on 19 December and sinks

== See also ==
- List of submarines of France

== Bibliography ==
- Moulin, Jean (October–November 2022). "Les sous-marins mouilleurs de mine type Saphir" [The Saphir-Class Minelaying-Submarines]. Navires & Histoire (in French) (133): 88–95. ISSN 1280-4290.
