= Lebègue =

Lebègue is a French surname. People with this surname include the following:

- Nicolas Lebègue (1631–1702), French composer and organist
- Henri Lebègue (1856–1938), French palaeographer
- Ernest Lebègue (1862–1943), French historian, brother of the former
- Léon Lebègue (1863–1944), French lithographer
- Raymond Lebègue (1895–1984), son of Henri, 20th-century French literary historian.
- Alphonse-Nicolas Lebègue (1814–1885), publisher from Brussels

== See also ==
- Victor-Amédée Lebesgue (1791–1875), French mathematician
- Henri Lebesgue (1875–1941), French mathematician
