= Hôtel de Ville, Le Perreux-sur-Marne =

Town hall in Le Perreux-sur-Marne, France

Hôtel de Ville
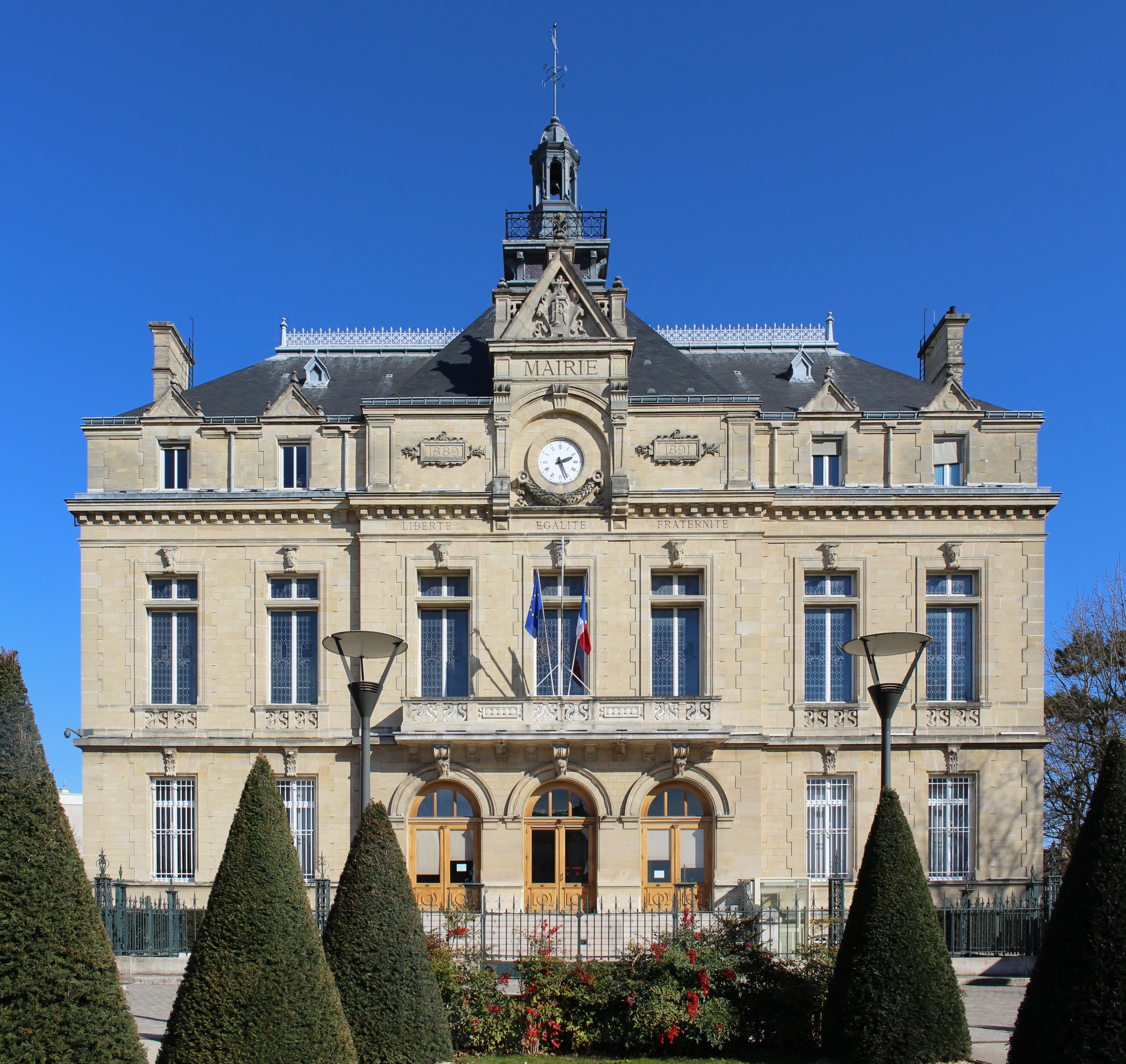
- The main frontage of the Hôtel de Ville in February 2019
- Interactive map of the Hôtel de Ville area

General information
- Type: City hall
- Architectural style: Neoclassical style
- Location: Le Perreux-sur-Marne, France
- Coordinates: 48.8407°N 2.5082°E
- Completed: 1891

Design and construction
- Architect: Pierre Mathieu

The Hôtel de Ville (French pronunciation: [otɛl də vil], City Hall) is a municipal building in Le Perreux-sur-Marne, Val-de-Marne, in the eastern suburbs of Paris, standing on Avenue du Général de Gaulle. It has been included on the Inventaire général des monuments by the French Ministry of Culture since 1986.

== History ==
Following the opening of the Paris-Est–Mulhouse-Ville railway in the mid-19th century, the village of Le Perreux-sur-Marne became geographically separated from the rest of the commune of Nogent-sur-Marne. This separation was administratively formalised when Le Perreux-sur-Marne officially became a commune in February 1887. In this context, the new town council led by the mayor, Henri Navarre, decided to commission a town hall. The site they selected had been occupied by the old town market. After a design competition involving 33 entries, an architect was selected and the foundation stone was laid by the Prefect of the Seine, Eugène Poubelle, on 16 March 1890. The new building was designed by Pierre Mathieu in the neoclassical style, built in ashlar stone and was officially opened on 25 October 1891.

The design involved a symmetrical main frontage of seven bays facing onto Avenue du Général de Gaulle. The central section of three bays, which was slightly projected forward, featured three rounded headed doorways with moulded surrounds and keystones on the ground floor, three transomed windows with moulded surrounds and keystones on the first floor, and a clock flanked by pilasters supporting a triangular pediment at attic level. There were panels indicating the start and end years of construction to the left and right of the clock and there was an octagonal belfry behind it. The outer bays were fenestrated with casement windows on the ground floor, transomed windows with moulded surrounds and keystones on the first floor, and dormer windows at attic level. Internally, the principal room was the Salle du Conseil (council chamber). The main staircase featured a fine ceiling, depicting mythological figures, which was painted by Alexandre Bailly in 1909.

During the Paris insurrection, part of the Second World War, the French Forces of the Interior seized the town hall on 19 August 1944. German troops briefly re-took control of the town hall, killing a teenager, Claude Jean-Romain, and a child, Claude Boibessot, in the process. This was six days in advance of the official liberation of the town by the French 2nd Armoured Division, commanded by General Philippe Leclerc, on 25 August 1944.

Some 16 colourful paintings by the Peruvian artist, Rodolpho Quiroz, depicting a dream-like universe, were exhibited in the town hall in November 2017.
