= Beauté-sur-Marne =

Coordinates: 48°49′58″N 2°28′31″E

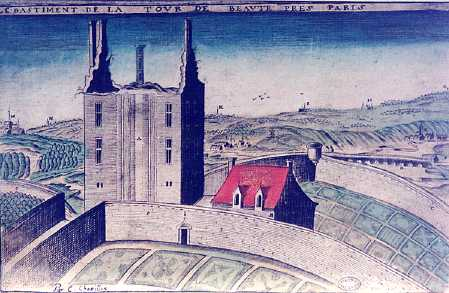
An engraving of the Chateau de Beauté-sur-Marne

Beauté-sur-Marne was a royal castle near Vincennes, situated on the territory of the current commune of Nogent-sur-Marne.

"Of all the pleasant and agreeable places one can find in this world, built in a suitable way, gay and pretty, to live and reside, that which is at the end of the forest of Vincennes, which was built by King Charles -- god grant him peace, joy, and health -- his eldest son, the Daupin of Viennois, gives the name of Beauty." -- Ballad of Eustache Deschamps (1346-1406)

== History ==
=== The castle of Charles V ===
Charles V, who sought the calm at a distance from the official court of Vincennes, restored "Beauty" in 1473. Beyond the drawbridge and the castle wall was a garden with a fountain. The manor was a large tower in which each floor is "of a piece". On the first floor was the bedroom of the Evangelists where the king slept. Elsewhere, there was a library. On the second floor was another bedroom with an altar for saying Mass. The whole was highly decorated, with some 62 tiles found during the construction of the railroad and which are now at the Carnavalet Museum in Paris.

It is remarkable that nothing is provided here to welcome the Queen, for whom Charles V bought the manor of Pleasure (Plaisance) in 1375. This manor, which gives its name to the commune of Neuilly-Plaisance, was held by his brother Philip the Bold, duke of Burgundy. Louis I of Anjou, another brother of the King, constructed another manor near Beauty, of which no trace remains.

=== Visit of Charles IV of the Holy Roman Empire ===
In 1378, Charles IV, Holy Roman Emperor, came to Beauty for a diplomatic visit to his nephew Charles V to discuss the hostilities of the English, and the co-existence of two popes. He was concerned mainly with strengthening the alliance between the two monarchies, already ancient, the House of Luxembourg being of French descent.

A manuscript at the National Library of France shows Charles V, King of France, welcoming Charles IV and his son, King Wenceslas IV of Bohemia.

=== Death of Charles V ===
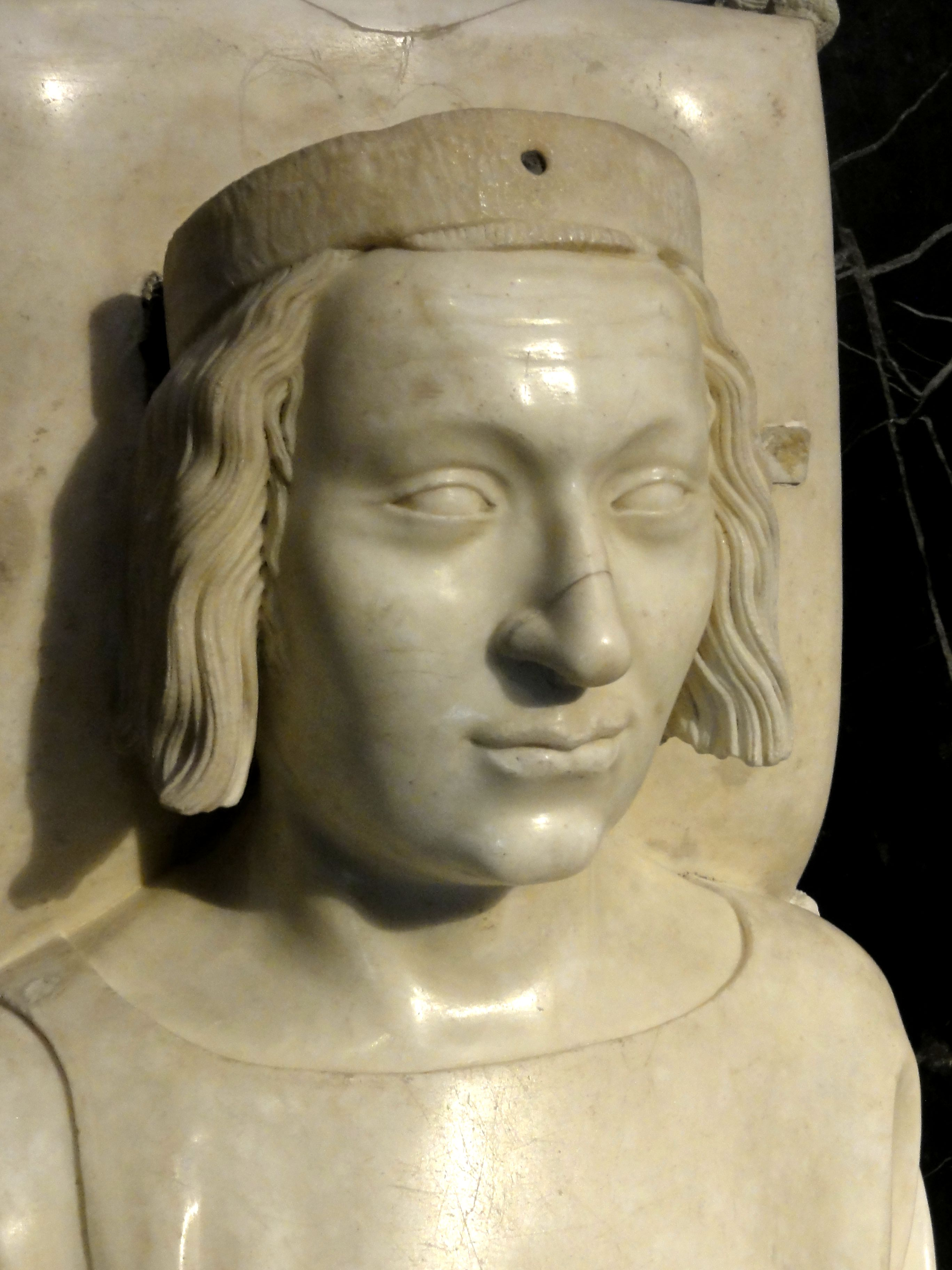
Detail of the recumbent figure of Charles V exhibited in the Basilica of Saint-Denis, in Paris

After the visit of the Holy Roman Emperor, the king stayed regularly at the Château de Beauté, where he signed several documents, and where he died on 16 September 1380, aged 43.

=== Agnès Sorel ===
It is not spoken of again until Charles VII made it a present to his mistress Agnès Sorel, daughter of a Picardy gentleman, Jean Soreau, who entered the life of Charles VII in 1443. In 1444, she became the first official favorite of a king of France, showered her with presents, such as the best tapestry, best dishes, ring goods and jewels, best cooks, and even the castle of Beauty-sur-Marne that the king gave her in 1448, making her thus the Lady of Beauty.
