= Alexandre Langlois =

French indologist and translator

Alexandre Langlois (French pronunciation: [alɛksɑ̃dʁ lɑ̃ɡlwa]; 4 August 1788, in Paris – 11 August 1854, in Nogent-sur-Marne) was a French Indologist and translator.

He taught classes at the Lycée Charlemagne, then worked as inspecteur at the Académie de Paris. He was a member of the Académie des Inscriptions et Belles-Lettres.

== Selected works ==
- Chefs-d'oeuvre du théatre indien (translated from Sanskrit into English by Horace Hayman Wilson, then translated from English into French by Langlois, 1828) – Masterpieces of the Indian theater.
- Harivansa ou Histoire de la famille de Hari (translation of Sanskrit, 1834–35) – Harivamsa, family history of Hari.
- Rig-Véda : ou livre des hymnes (translation of Sanskrit; 2nd edition, 1872) – Rigveda; book of hymns.
- The Transmigration of the Seven Brahmans by Henry David Thoreau, an English translation from Langlois' Harivansa; edited by Arthur Christy (1972).
