= Canton of Nogent-sur-Marne =

Coordinates: 48.8333°N 2.4833°E

Nogent-sur-Marne
- Canton
- Country: France
- Region: Île-de-France
- Department: Val-de-Marne
- No. of communes: {{{nbcomm}}}
- Area: 3.96 km^{2} (1.53 sq mi)
- Population (2023): 66,795
  - Density: 16,900/km^{2} (43,700/sq mi)
- INSEE code: 9414

The canton of Nogent-sur-Marne is a French canton, located in the arrondissement of Nogent-sur-Marne, in the Val-de-Marne département (Île-de-France région).

== Composition ==
Since the French canton reorganisation which came into effect in March 2015, the communes of the canton of Nogent-sur-Marne are:

- Le Perreux-sur-Marne
- Nogent-sur-Marne (partly)

== See also ==
- Cantons of the Val-de-Marne department
- Communes of the Val-de-Marne department
