= Hôtel de Ville, Nogent-sur-Marne =

Town hall in Nogent-sur-Marne, France

Hôtel de Ville
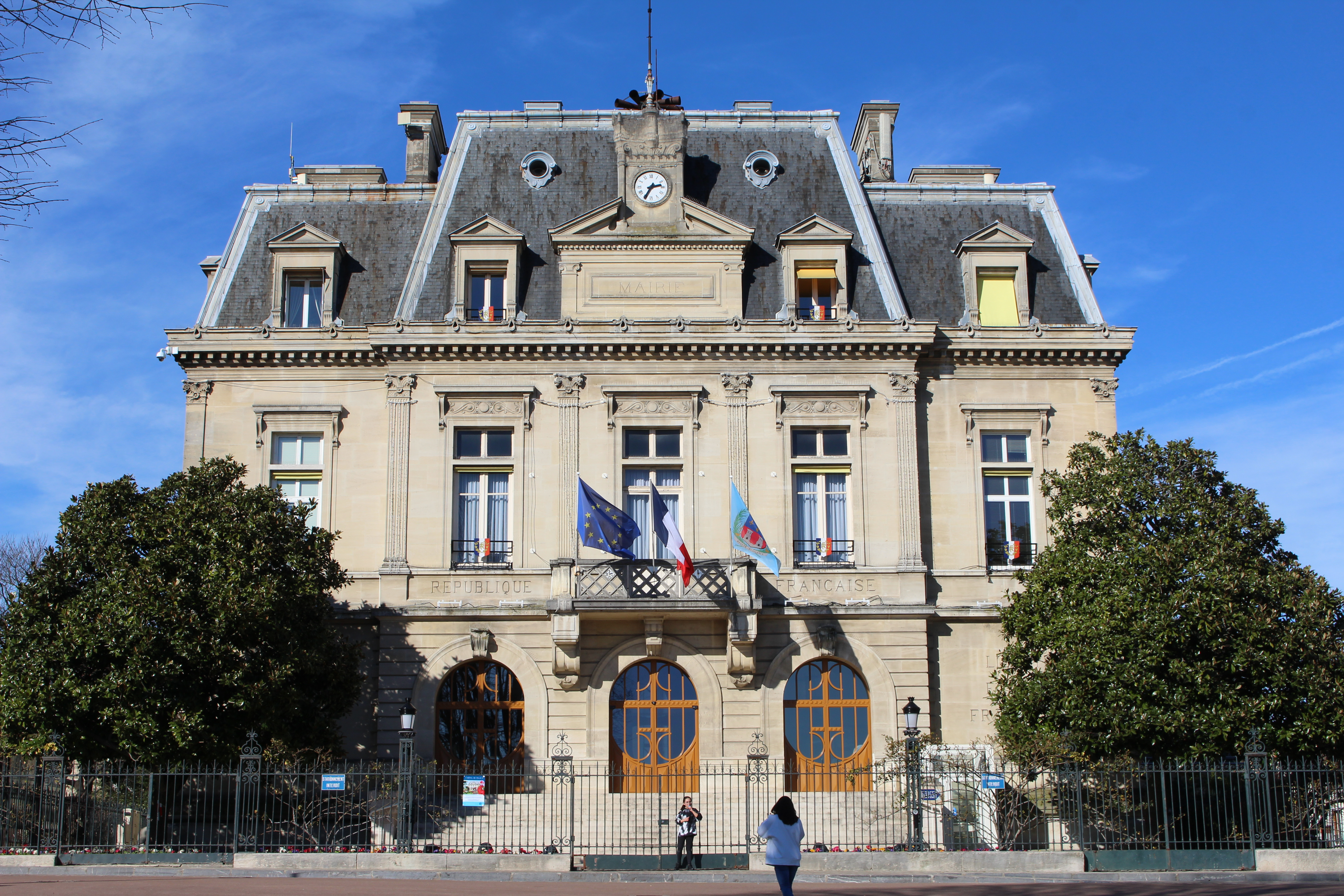
- The main frontage of the Hôtel de Ville in February 2019
- Interactive map of the Hôtel de Ville area

General information
- Type: City hall
- Architectural style: Neoclassical style
- Location: Nogent-sur-Marne, France
- Coordinates: 48.8392°N 2.4915°E
- Completed: 1879

Design and construction
- Architect: Victor Guillemin

The Hôtel de Ville (French pronunciation: [otɛl də vil], City Hall) is a municipal building in Nogent-sur-Marne, Val-de-Marne, in the eastern suburbs of Paris, standing on Place Roland Nungesser. It has been included on the Inventaire général des monuments by the French Ministry of Culture since 1986.

== History ==
Following the French Revolution, the town council initially met at the home of the mayor at the time. This arrangement continued until 1826, when Claire Sophie Mercier, Comtesse de Larboust, died, leaving sufficient funds in her will for a clergy house, for a school and, when supplemented by additional funds from the council, for a municipal office. The Sisters of Charity and the De La Salle Brothers were invited to manage the school. The building was erected on the corner of Grand-Rue and Rue Charles VII and completed in 1835.

In the second half of the 18th century, following significant population growth, the council decided to commission a dedicated town hall. This became possible in 1872, when Marshal Jean-Baptiste Vaillant offered his home on the south side of Place Roland Nungesser. The council instructed the demolition of Vaillant's house in 1876. The new building was designed by Victor Guillemin in the neoclassical style, built in ashlar stone and was completed in 1879.

The design involved a symmetrical main frontage of five bays facing onto what is now Grande Rue Charles de Gaulle. The central section of three bays, which was slightly projected forward, featured three round headed openings with voussoirs and keystones on the ground floor. There were three tall transomed windows with friezes and cornices on the first floor; the central window also featured a balcony. The outer bays were fenestrated in a similar style and, on the first floor, the bays were flanked by Ionic order pilasters supporting a modillioned cornice. Above the central bay, there was a panel, inscribed with the word "Mairie", which was surmounted by an open pediment containing a clock. There were dormer windows above the other bays. Internally, the principal room was the Salon d'Honneur, which was decorated with murals by Adrien Karbowsky.

A war memorial, in the form of an angel holding a helmet, which was intended to commemorate the lives of local service personnel who had died in the First World War, was created by the sculptor, Charles Billott, and unveiled in front of the town hall on 9 November 1924. During the Paris insurrection, part of the Second World War, elements of the French Forces of the Interior seized the town hall on 18 August 1944. German troops briefly regained control, before the town was liberated by the French 2nd Armoured Division, commanded by General Philippe Leclerc, on 25 August 1944.
