= Tropical Agronomy Garden, Paris =

Urban park in Paris, France

Coordinates: 48°50′2″N 2°28′0″E

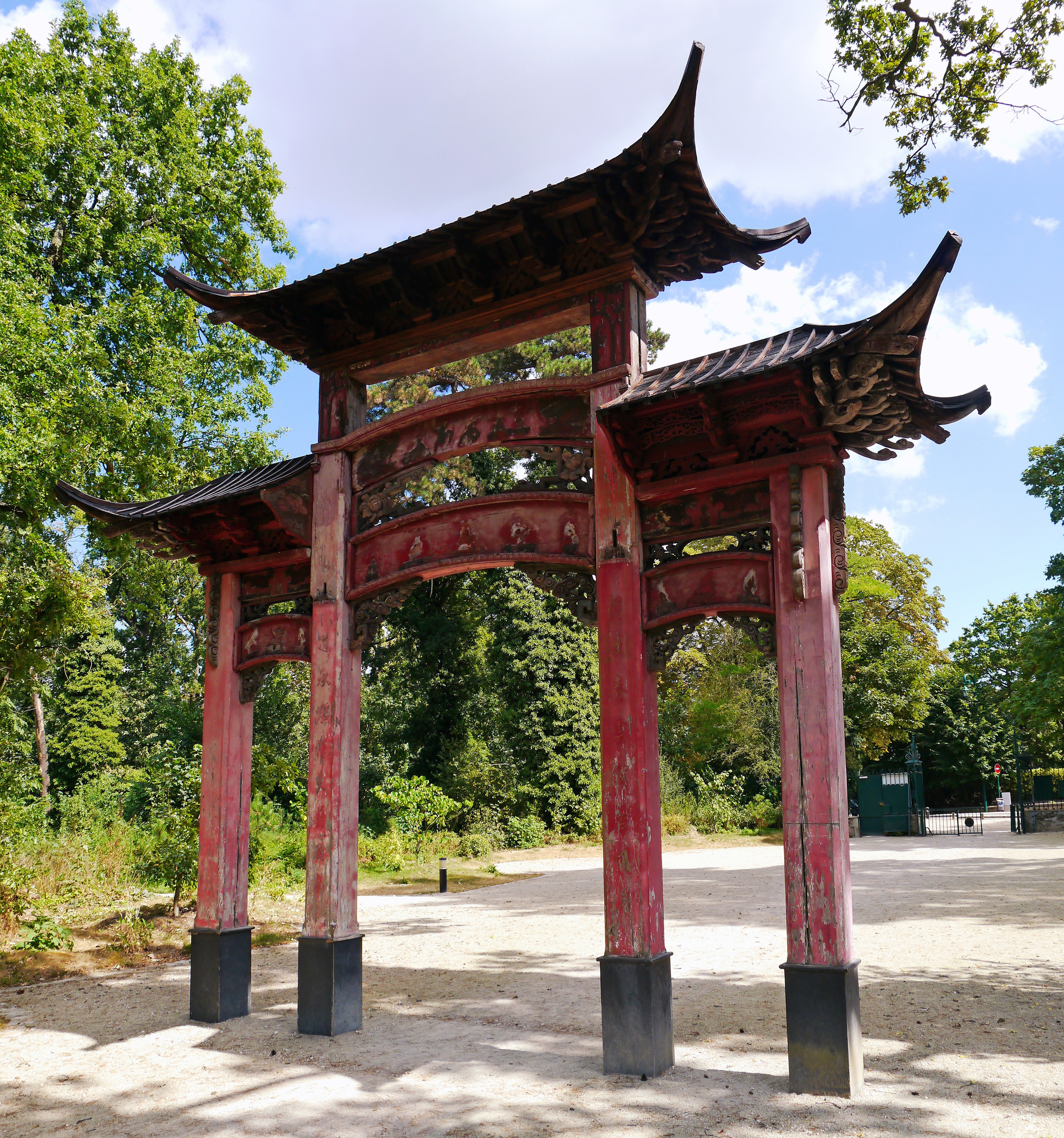
Chinese Gate in the garden

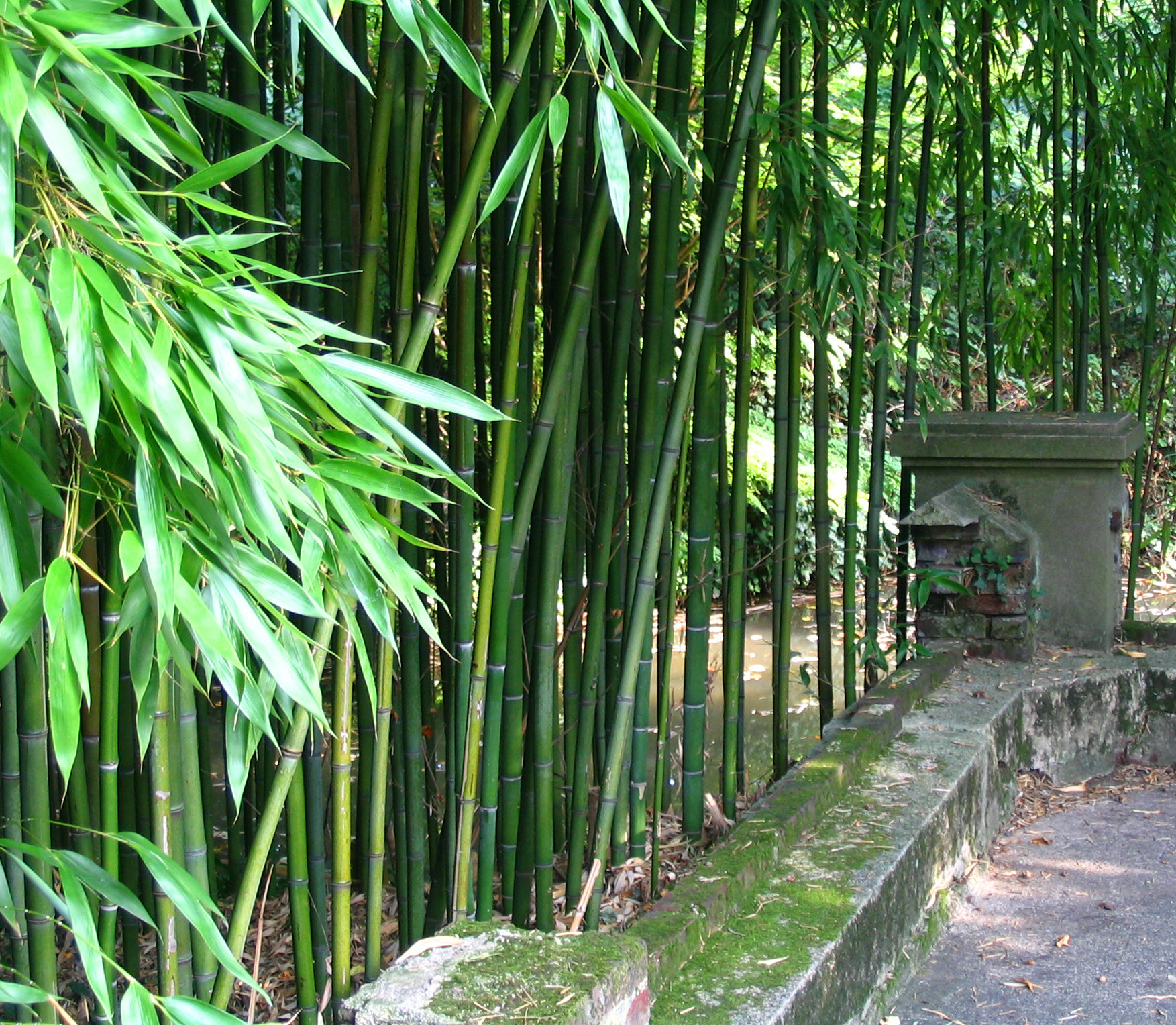
Remains of the bamboo grove of the Tropical Garden, set up in 1907 (composed of Phyllostachys viridiglaucescens bamboo).

The Tropical Agronomy Garden (jardin d'agronomie tropicale René-Dumont) is a green space at the far eastern side of the bois de Vincennes in Paris on the edge of Nogent-sur-Marne, almost at the easternmost part of Paris. It stands on the site of a colonial trial garden created at the end of the 19th century to increase agricultural production in the French colonies. The exhibition had between one and two million visitors and was accounted a success, though the shows and the pavilions hosting them later led to it being described as a human zoo.

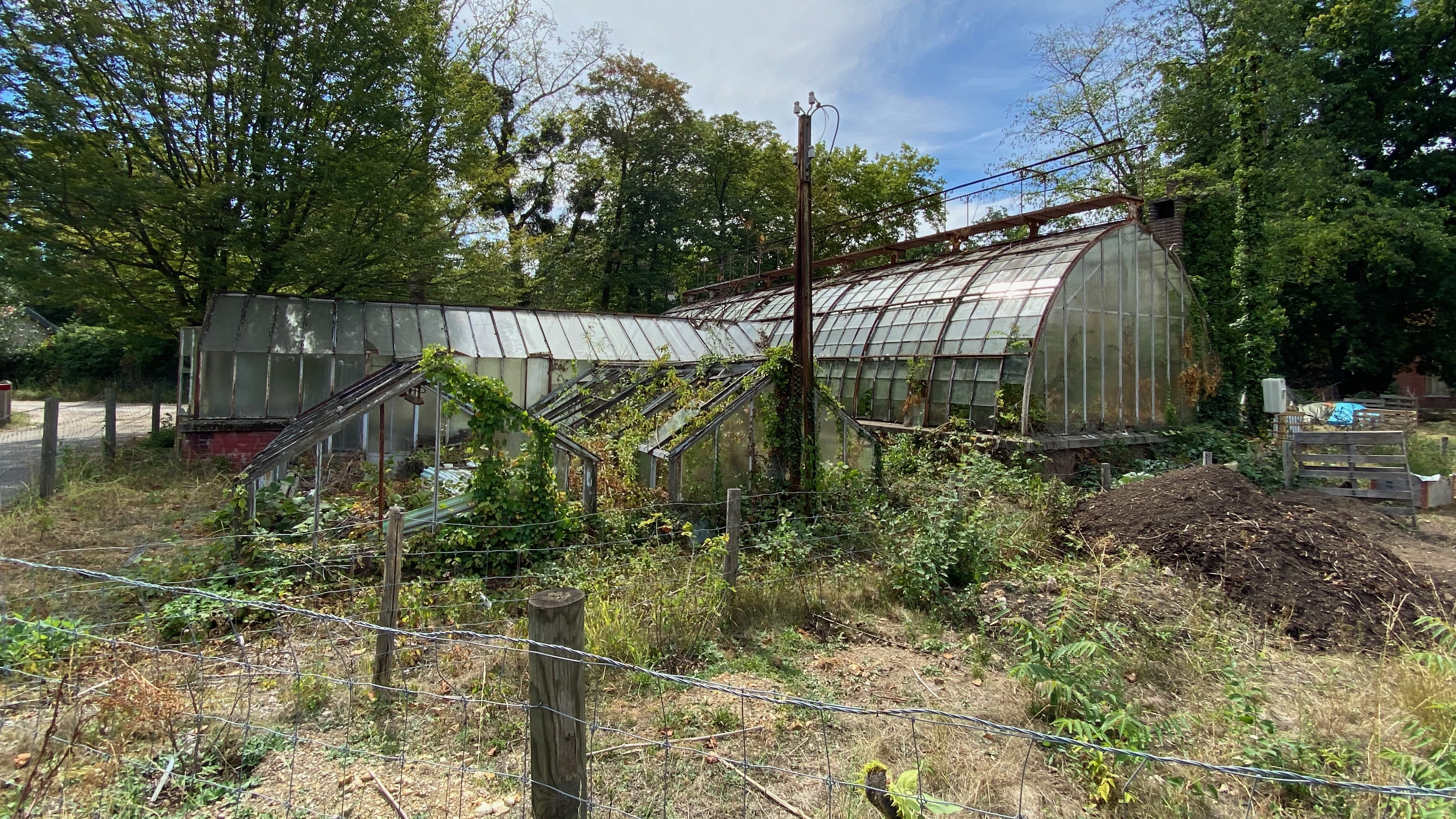
Abandoned greenhouses.

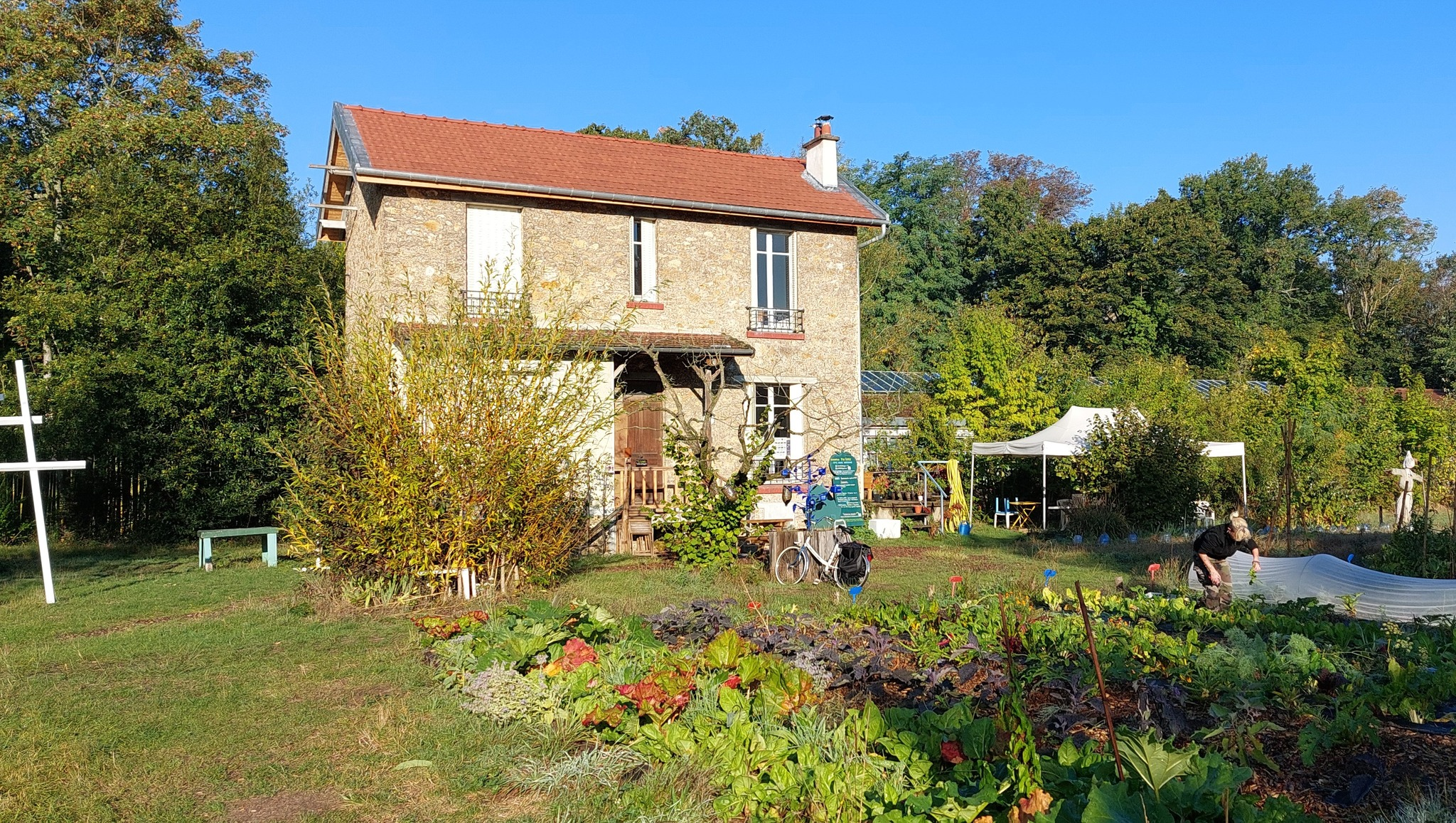
'V'île Fertile' a participatory urban farm.

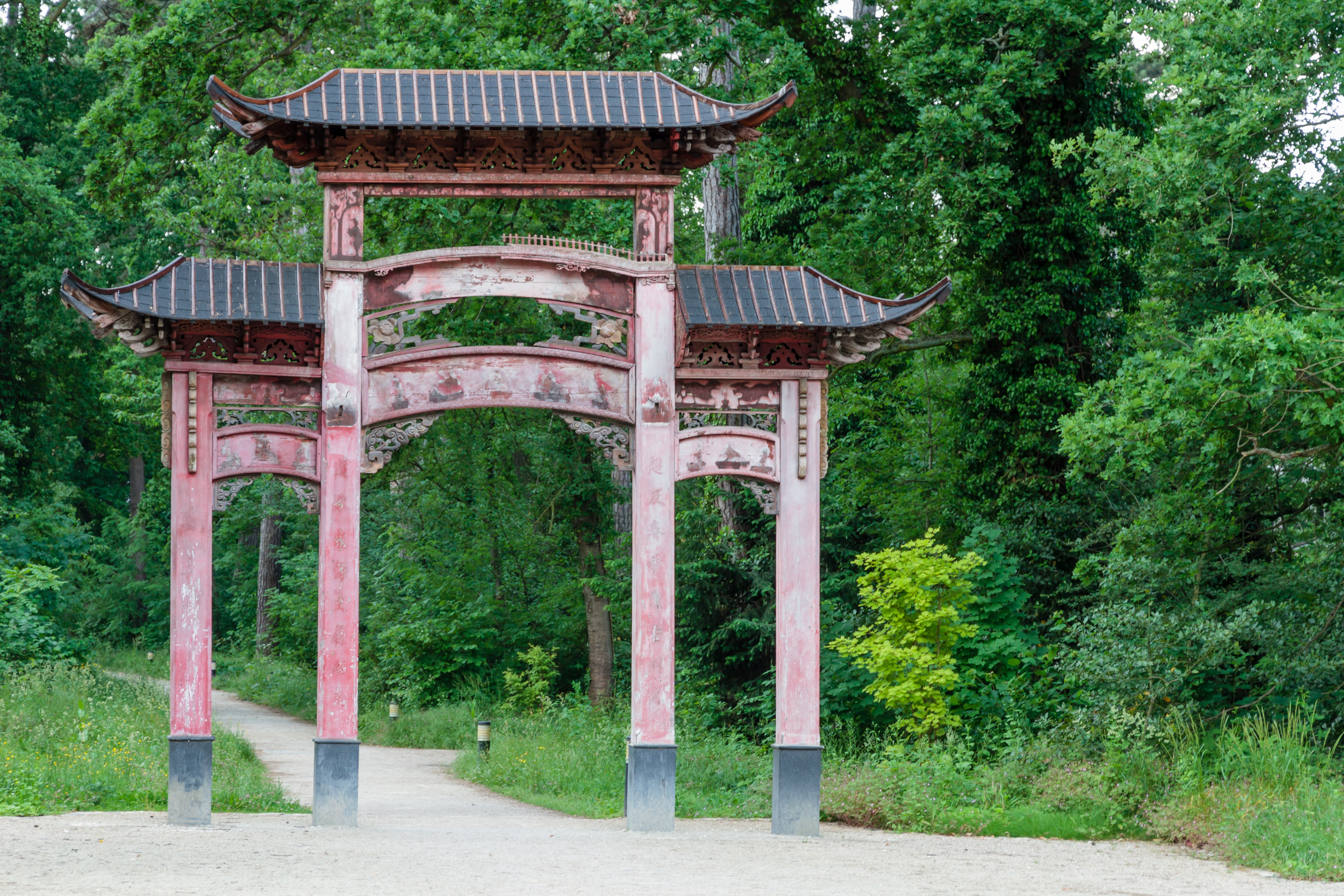
Chinese gate

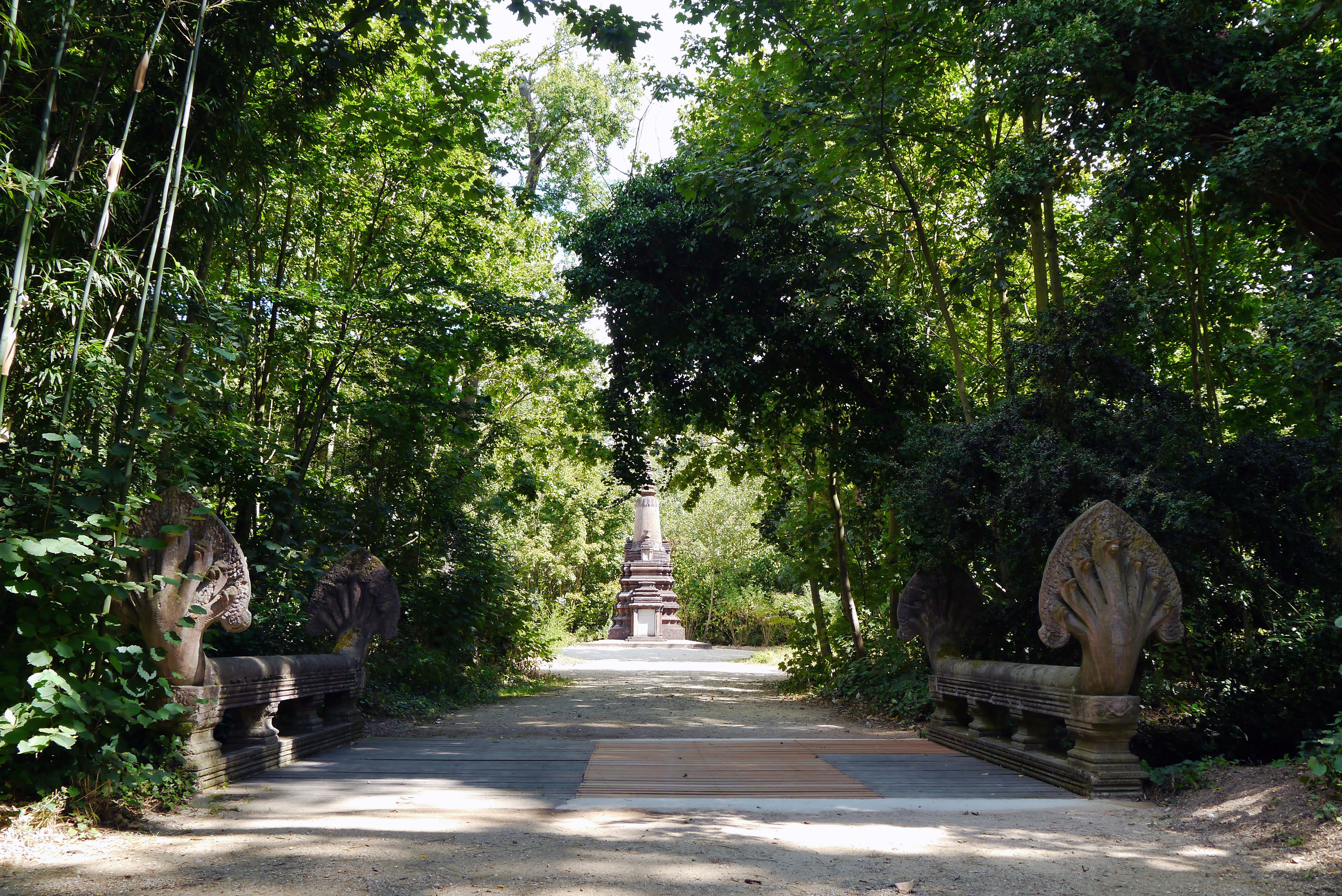
Khmer bridge

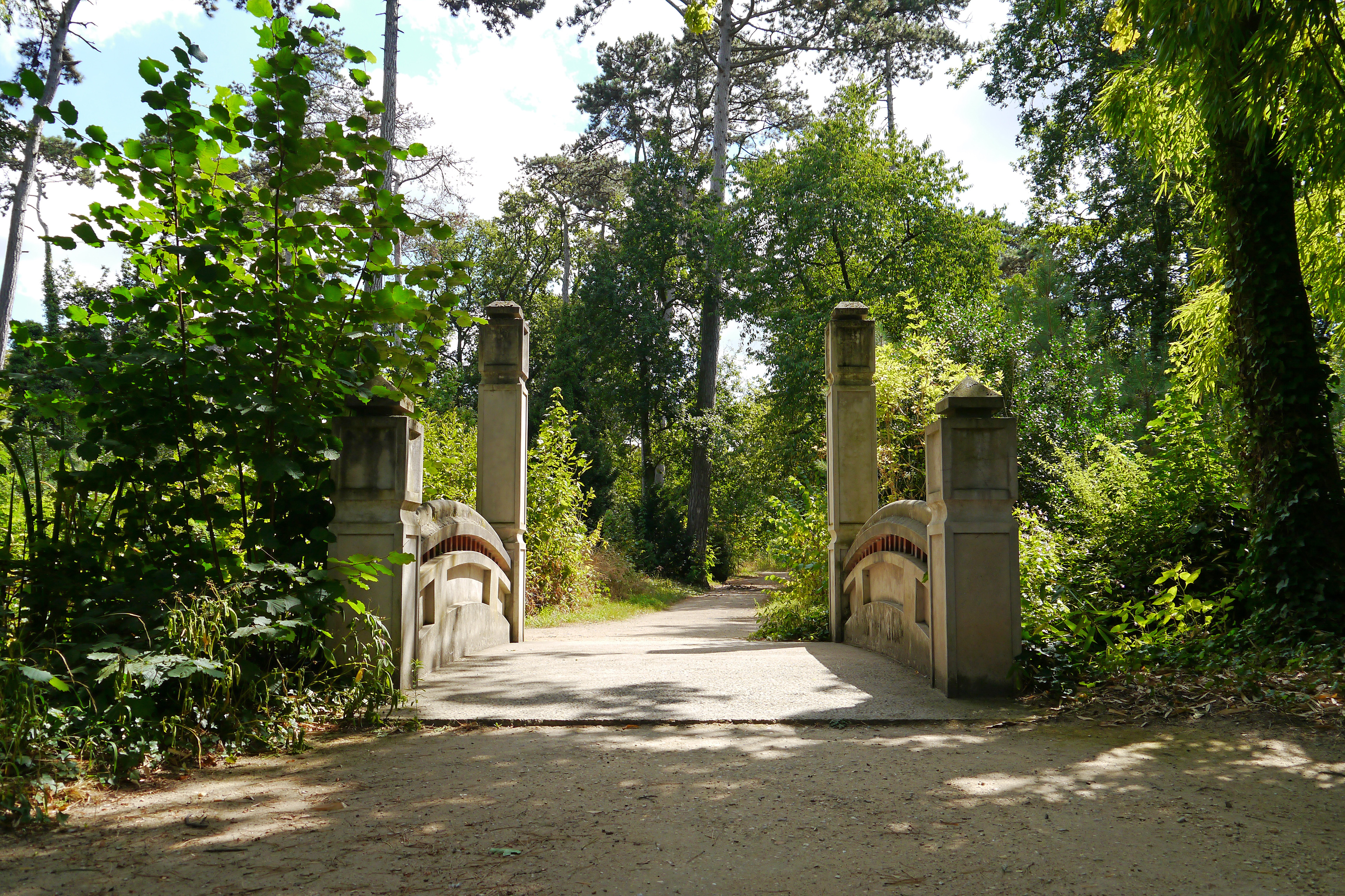
Tonkin bridge

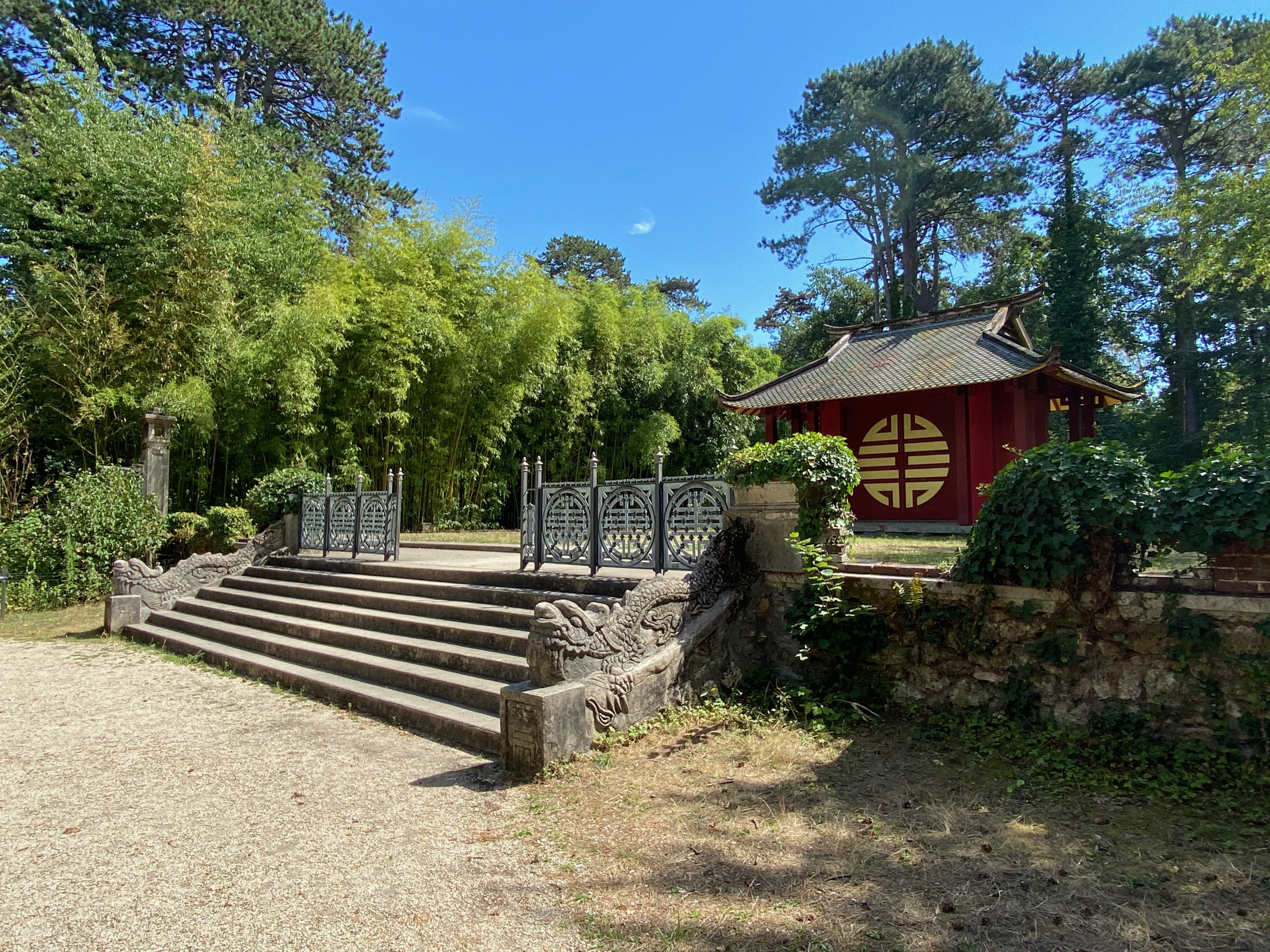
Temple.

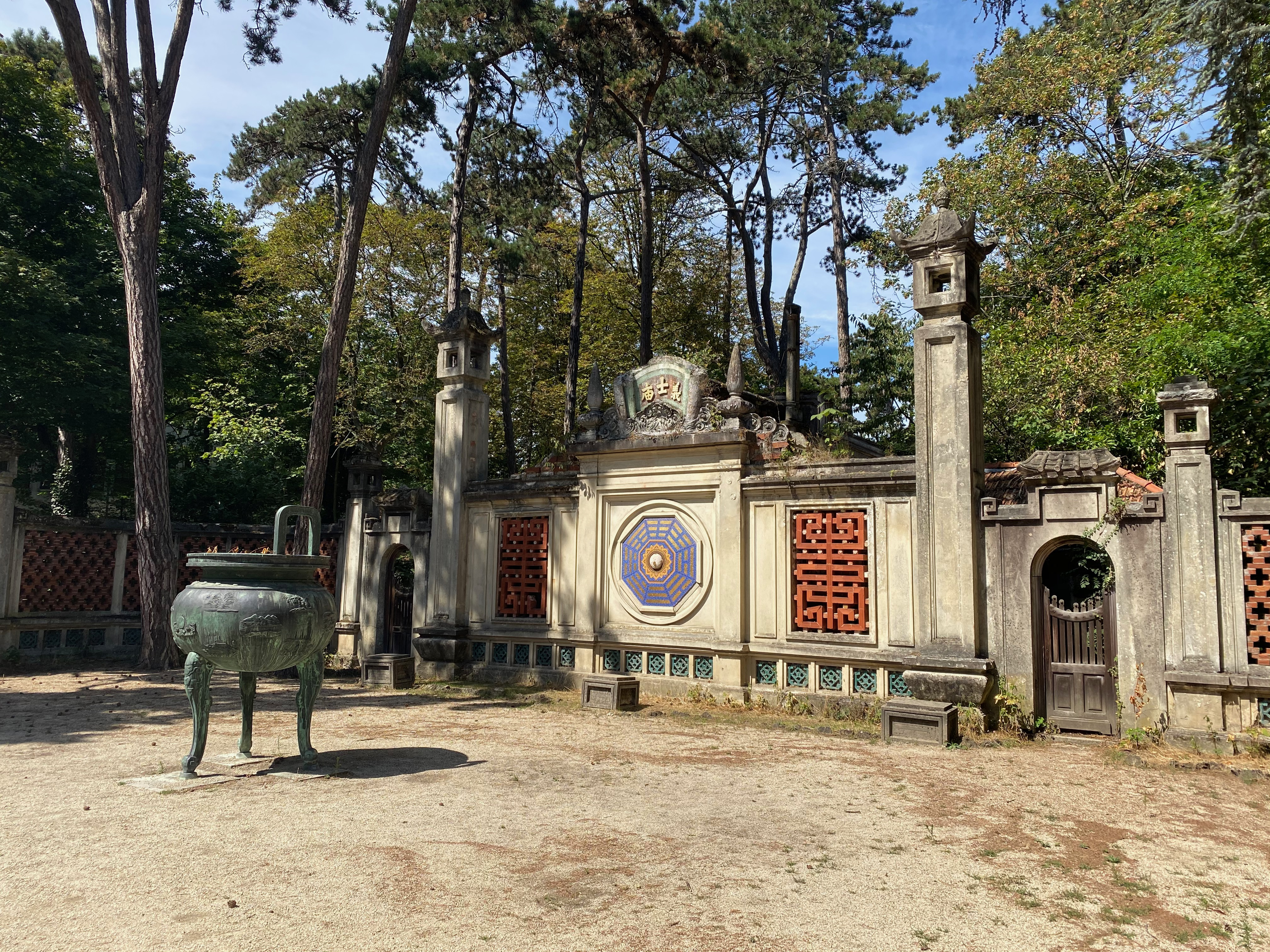
Esplanade du Dinh.

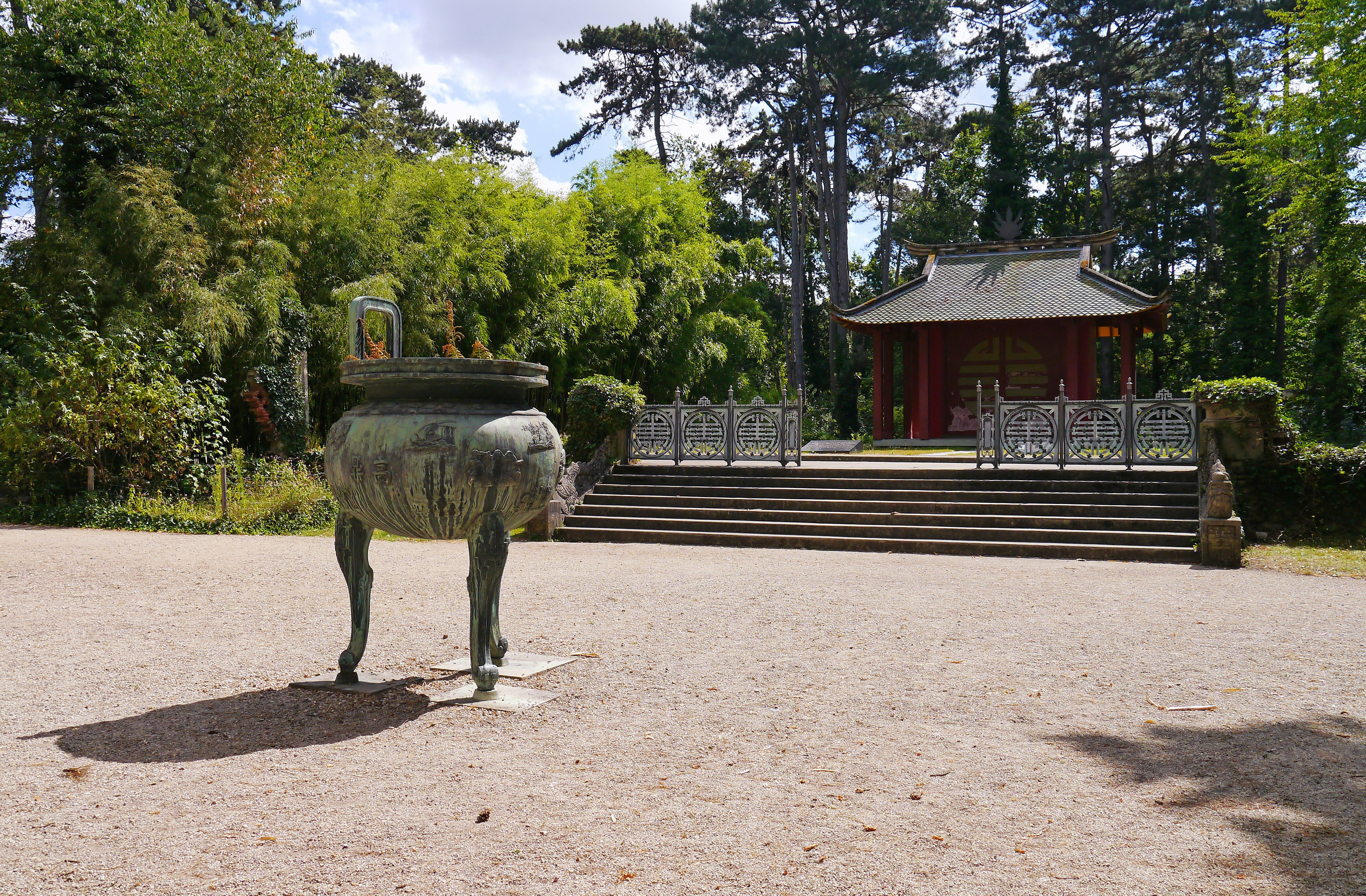
Urn.
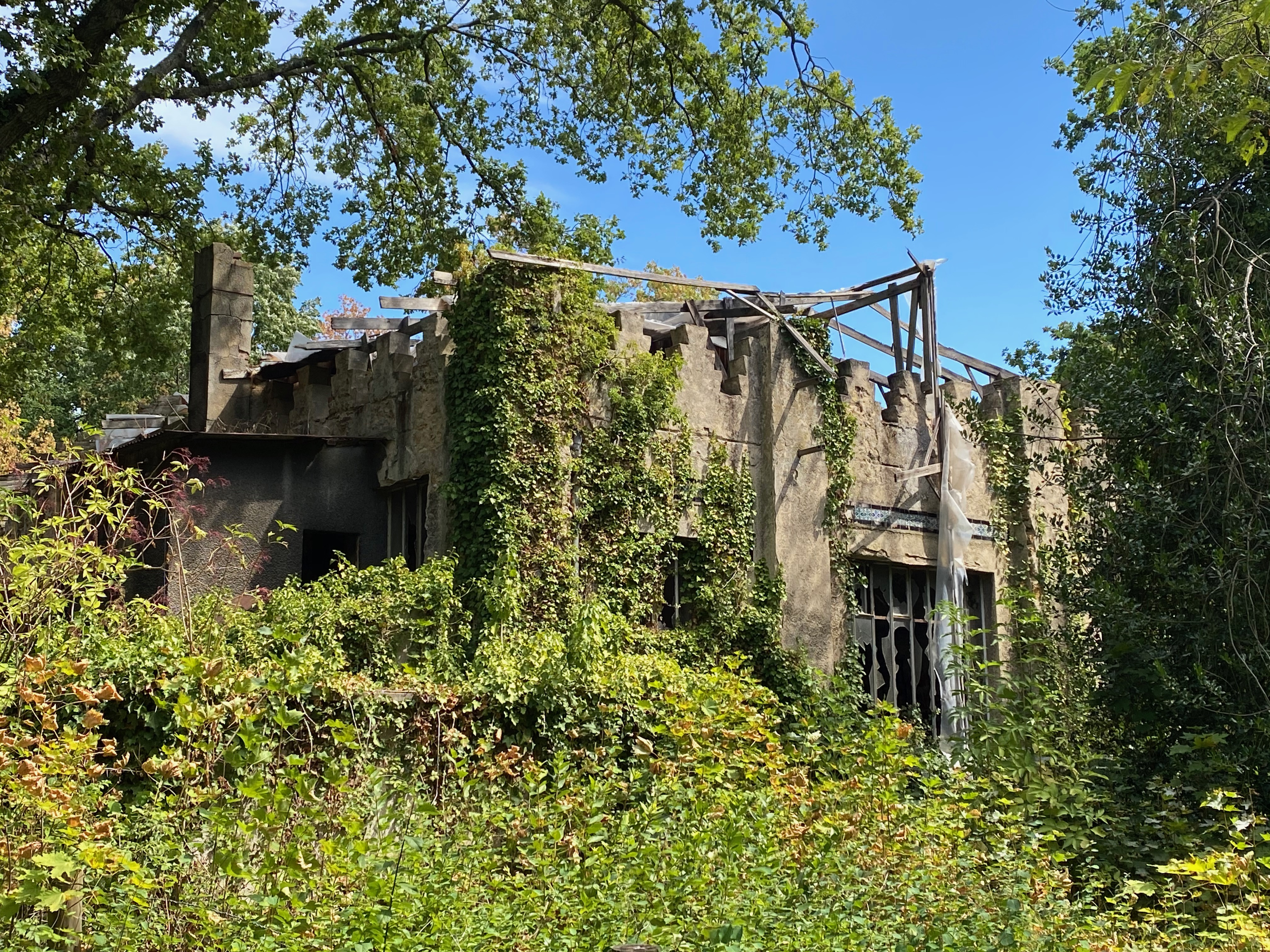
Morocco Pavilion.

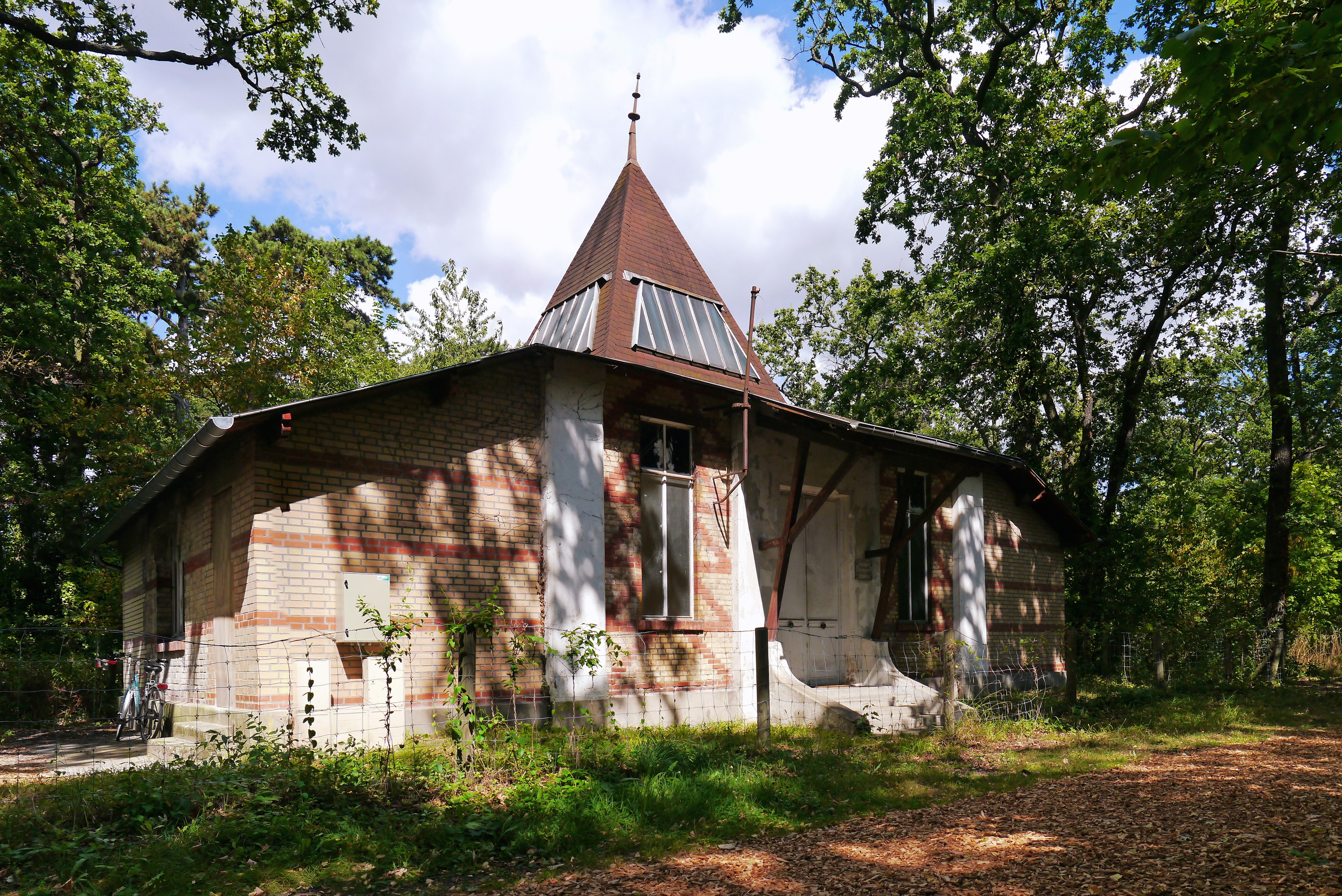
French Guiana Pavilion.

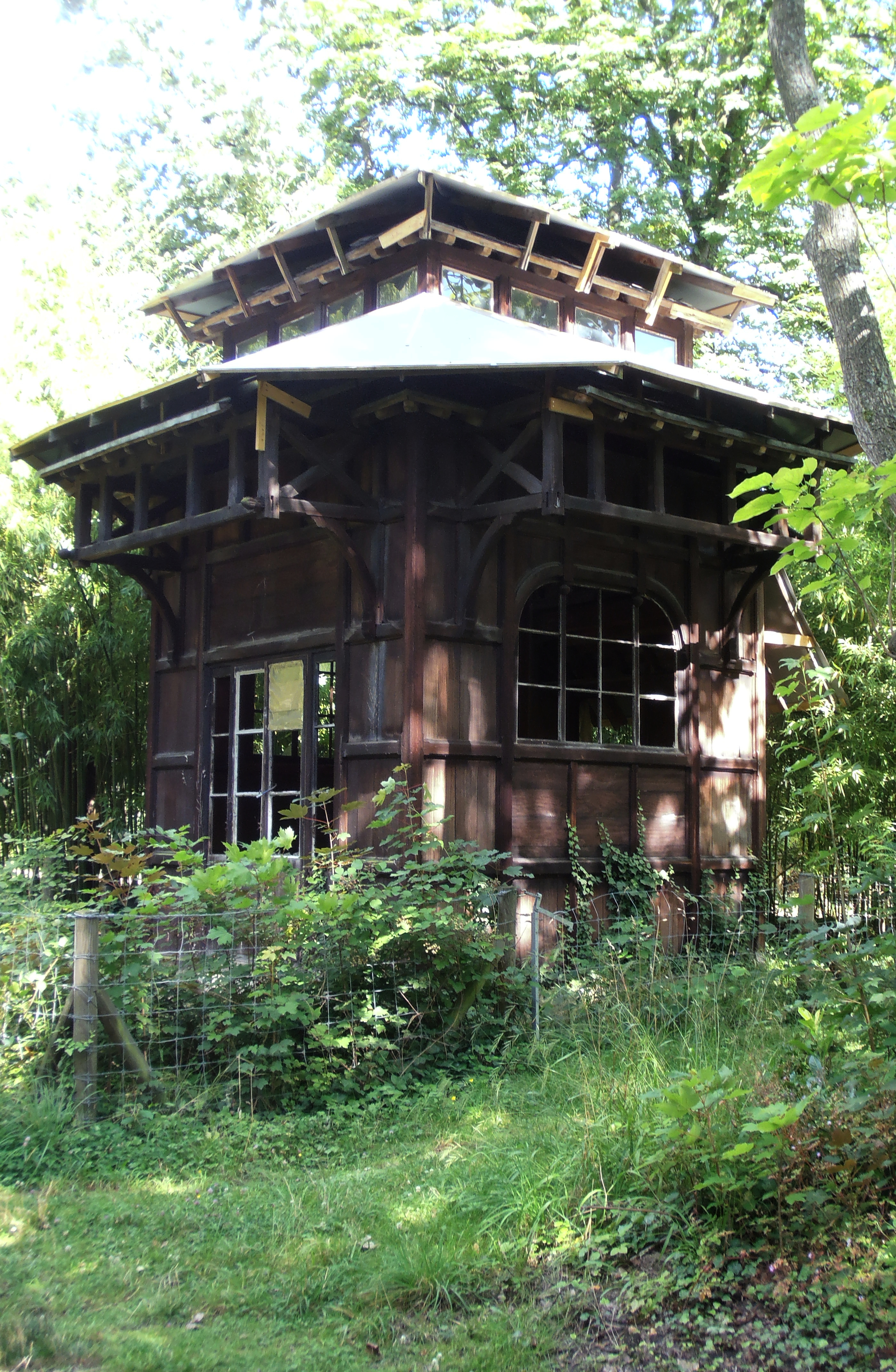
La Réunion Pavilion.

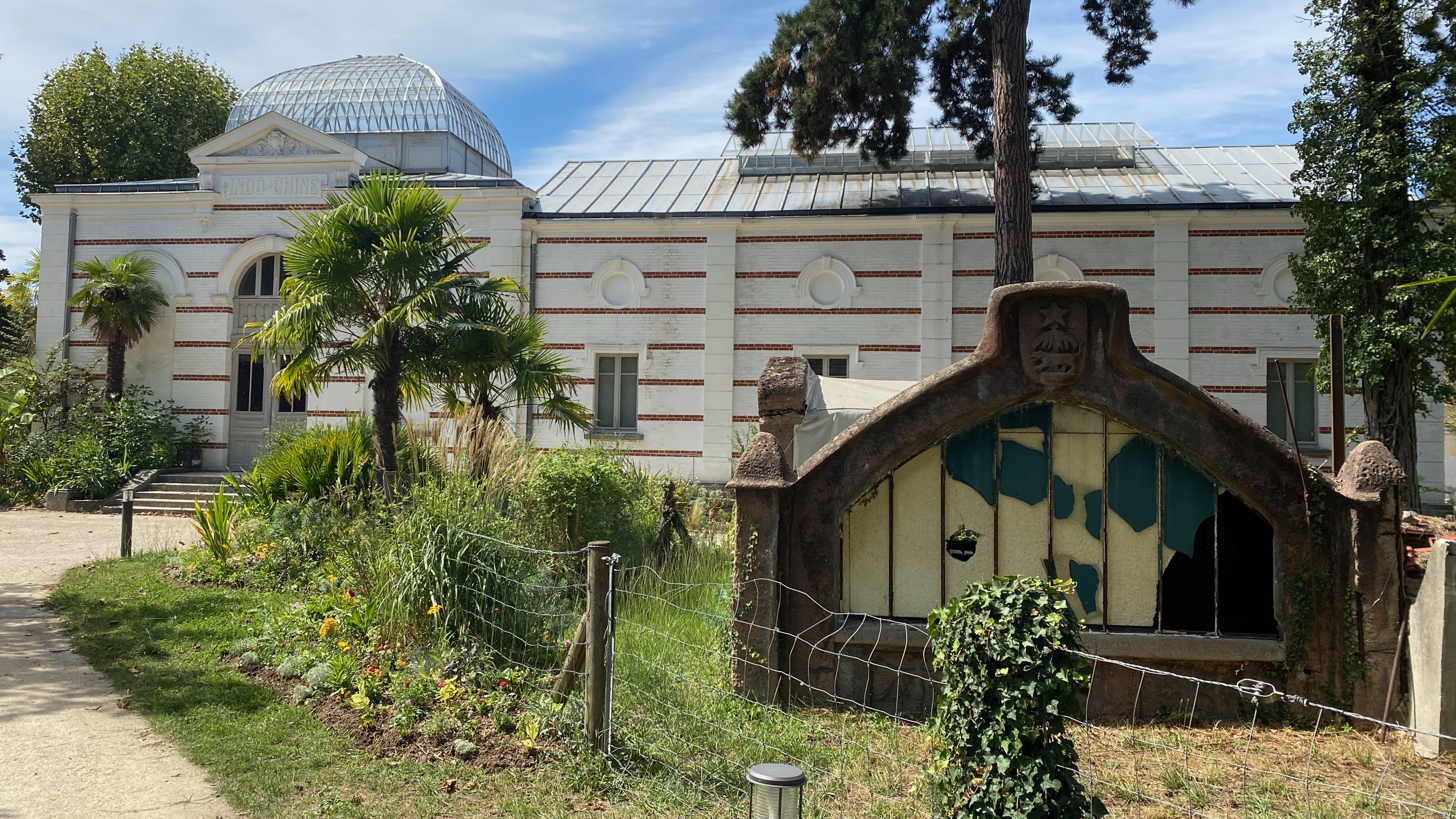
Dahomey Greenhouse and Vietnamese Pavilion.

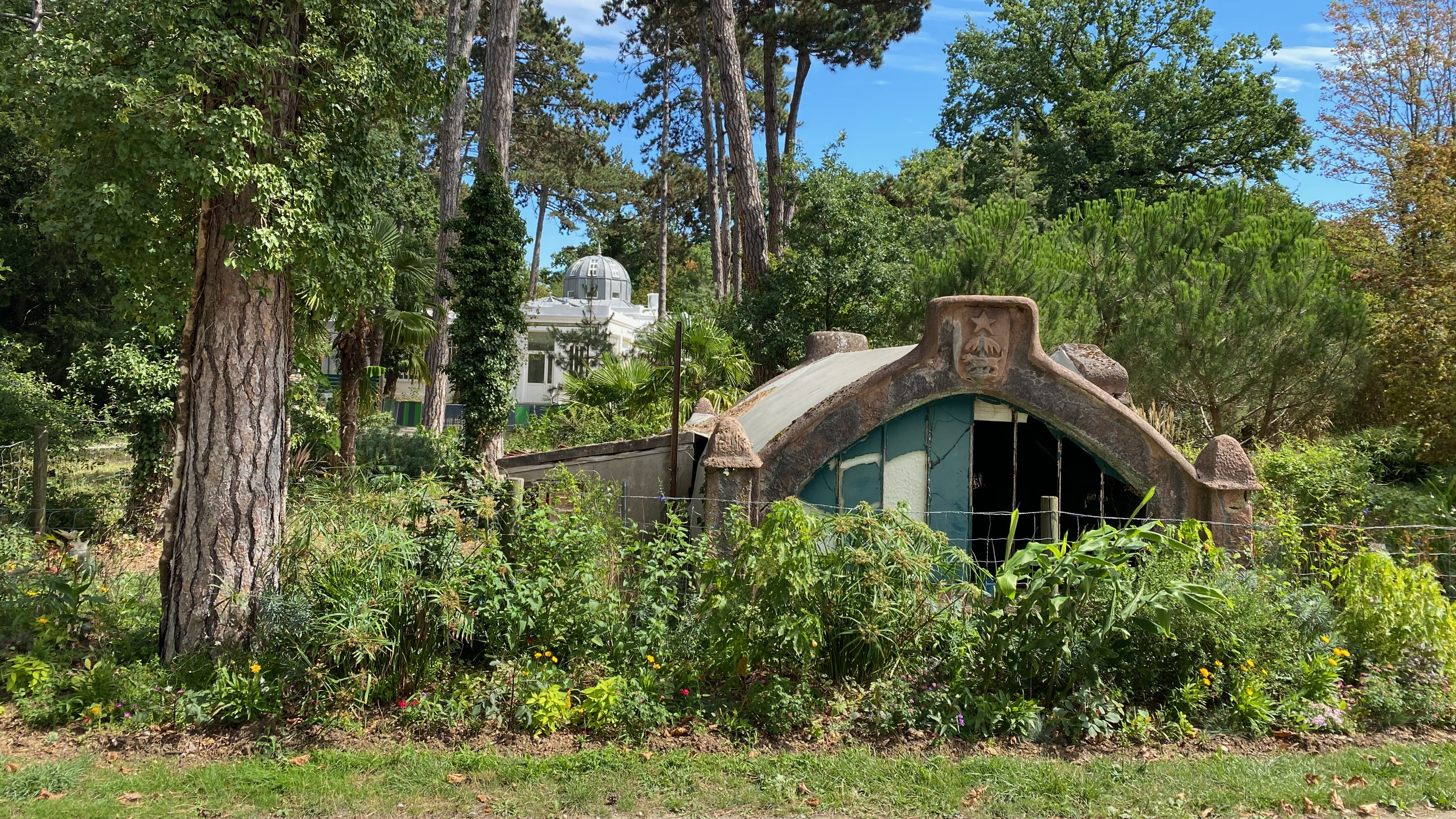
Dahomey Greenhouse and Tunisian Pavilion.

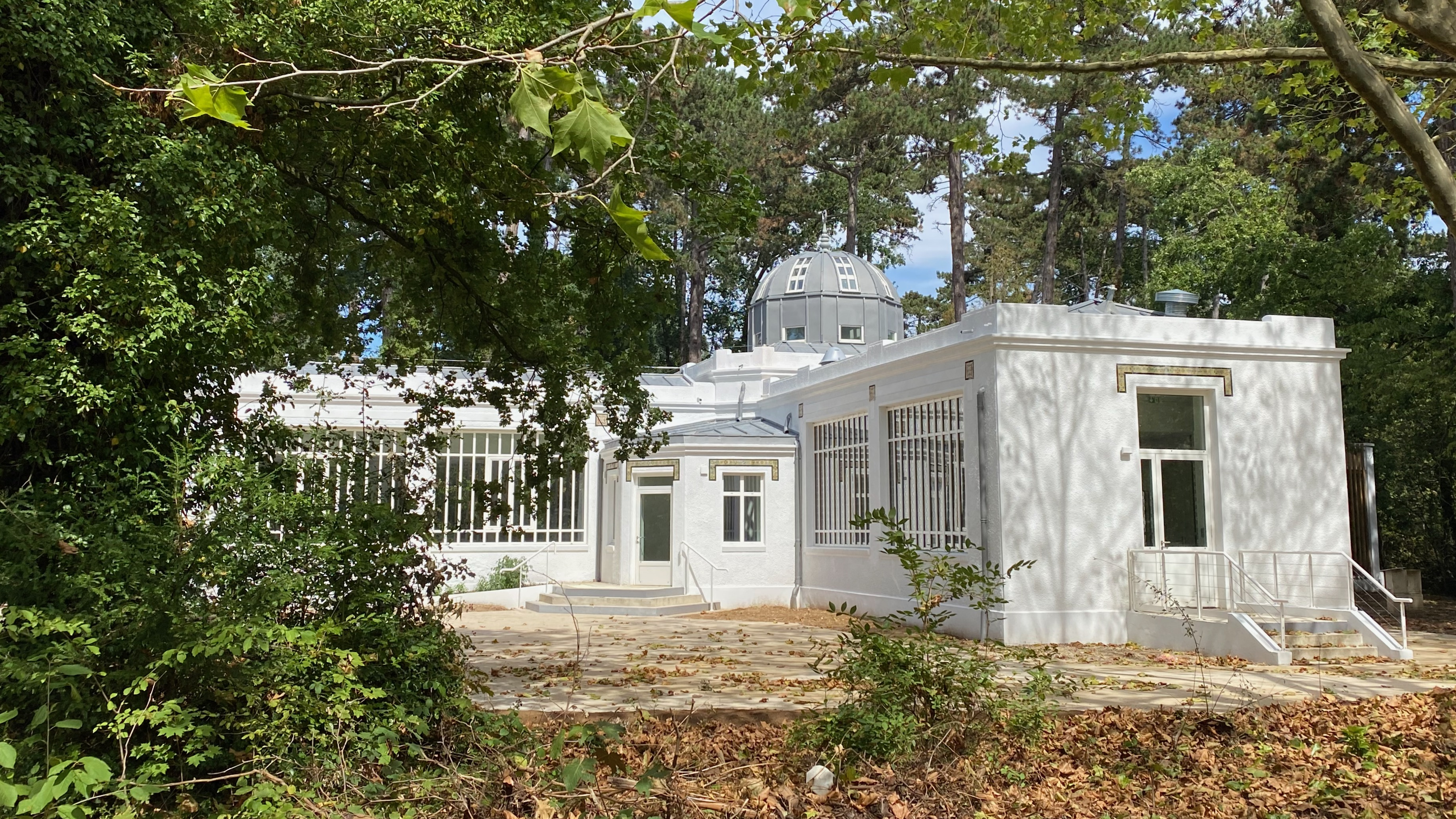
Tunisian Pavilion
Monuments

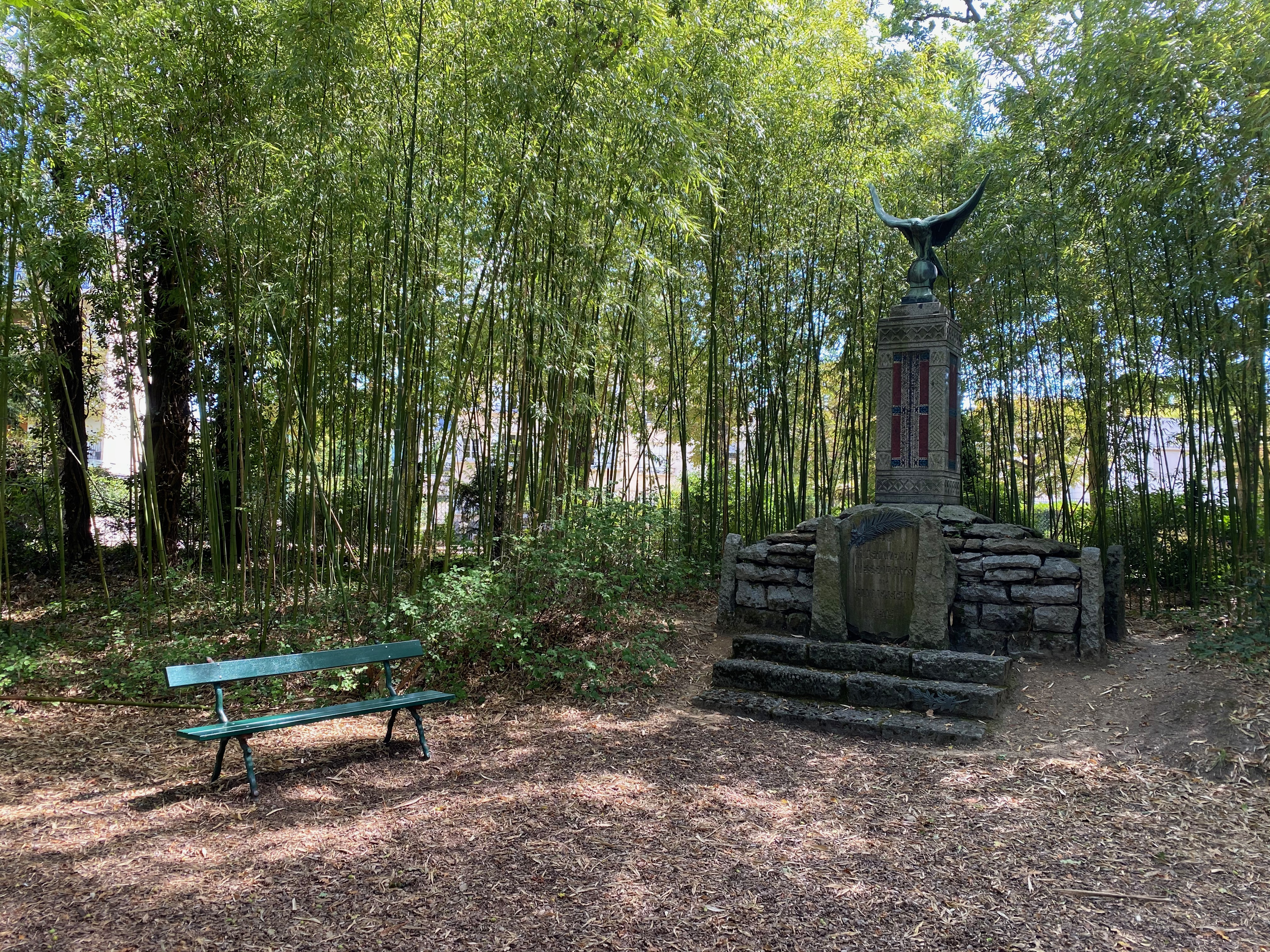
Madagascar.

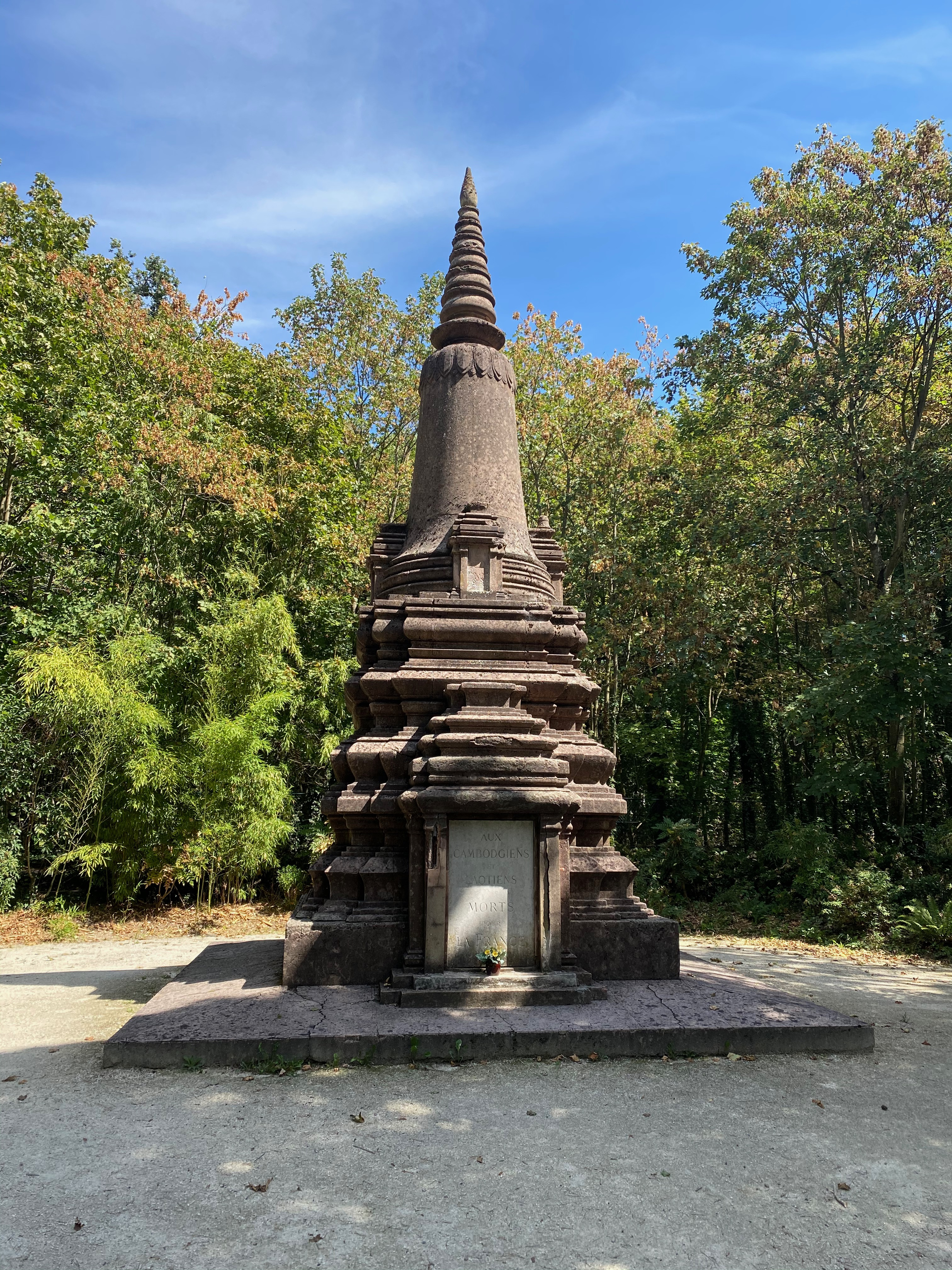
Cambodians and Laotians.

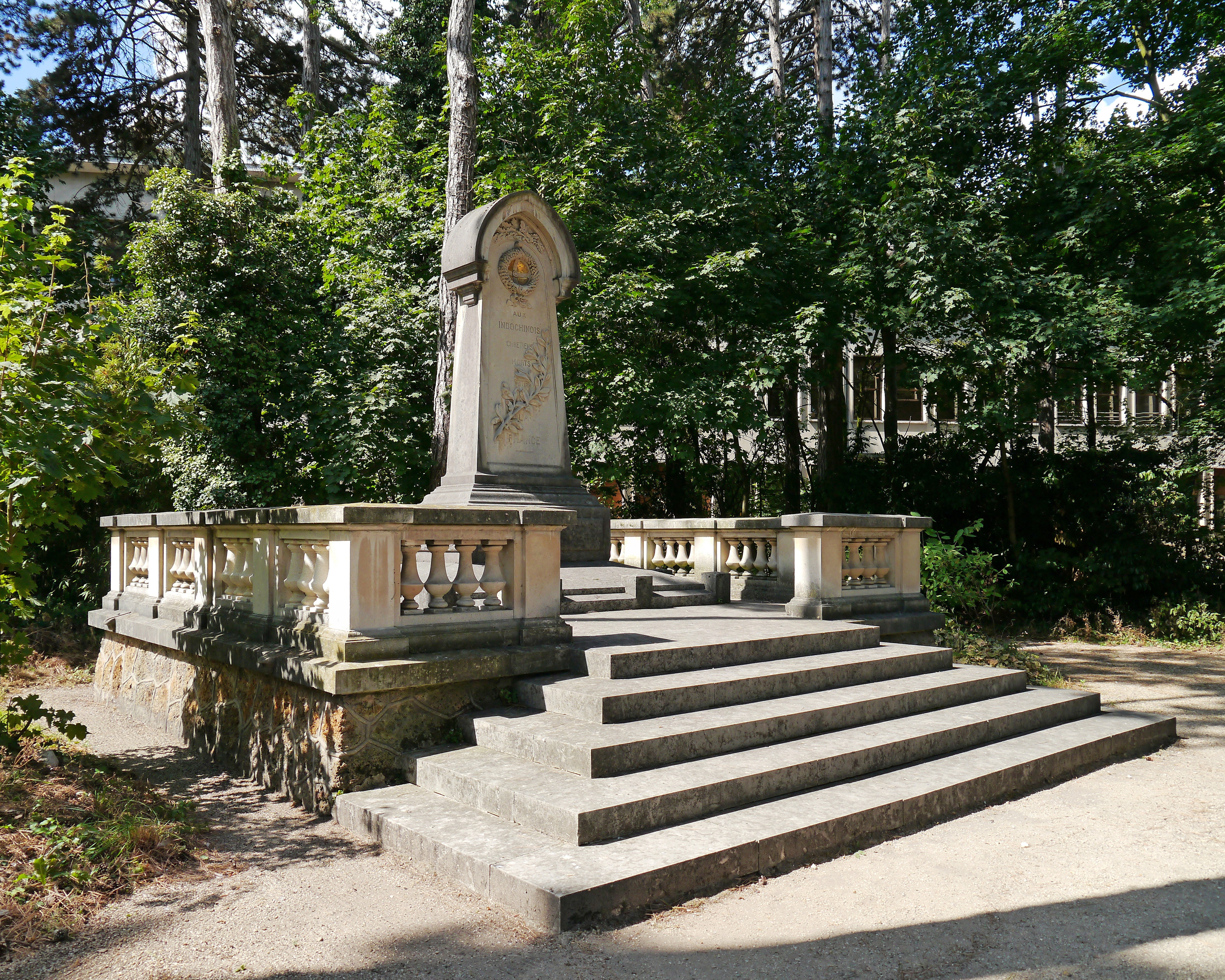
Vietnamese Christians.

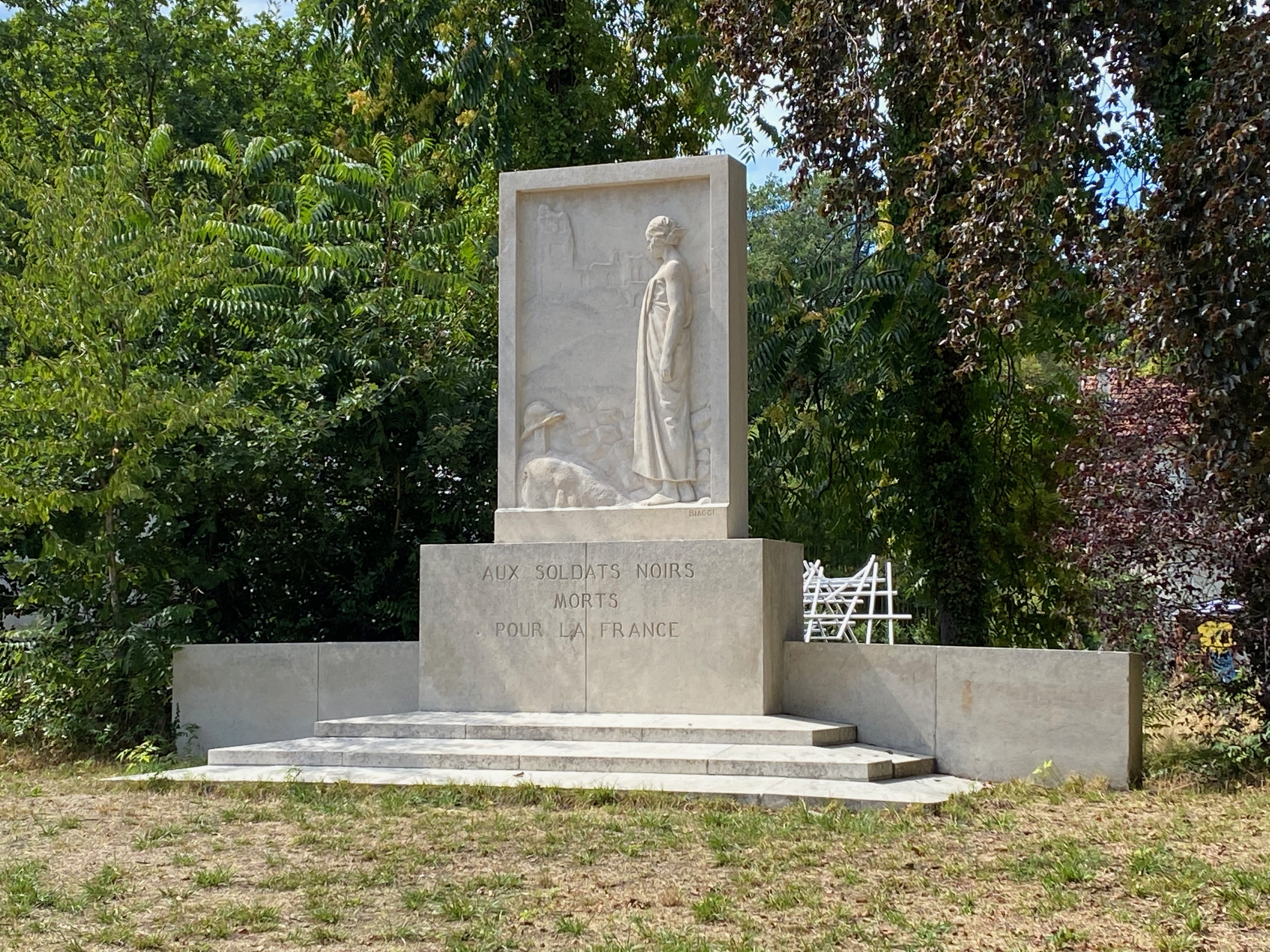
"To black soldiers who died for France".

== External links (in French) ==
- Official site
