= Johanne Gomis =

French basketball player

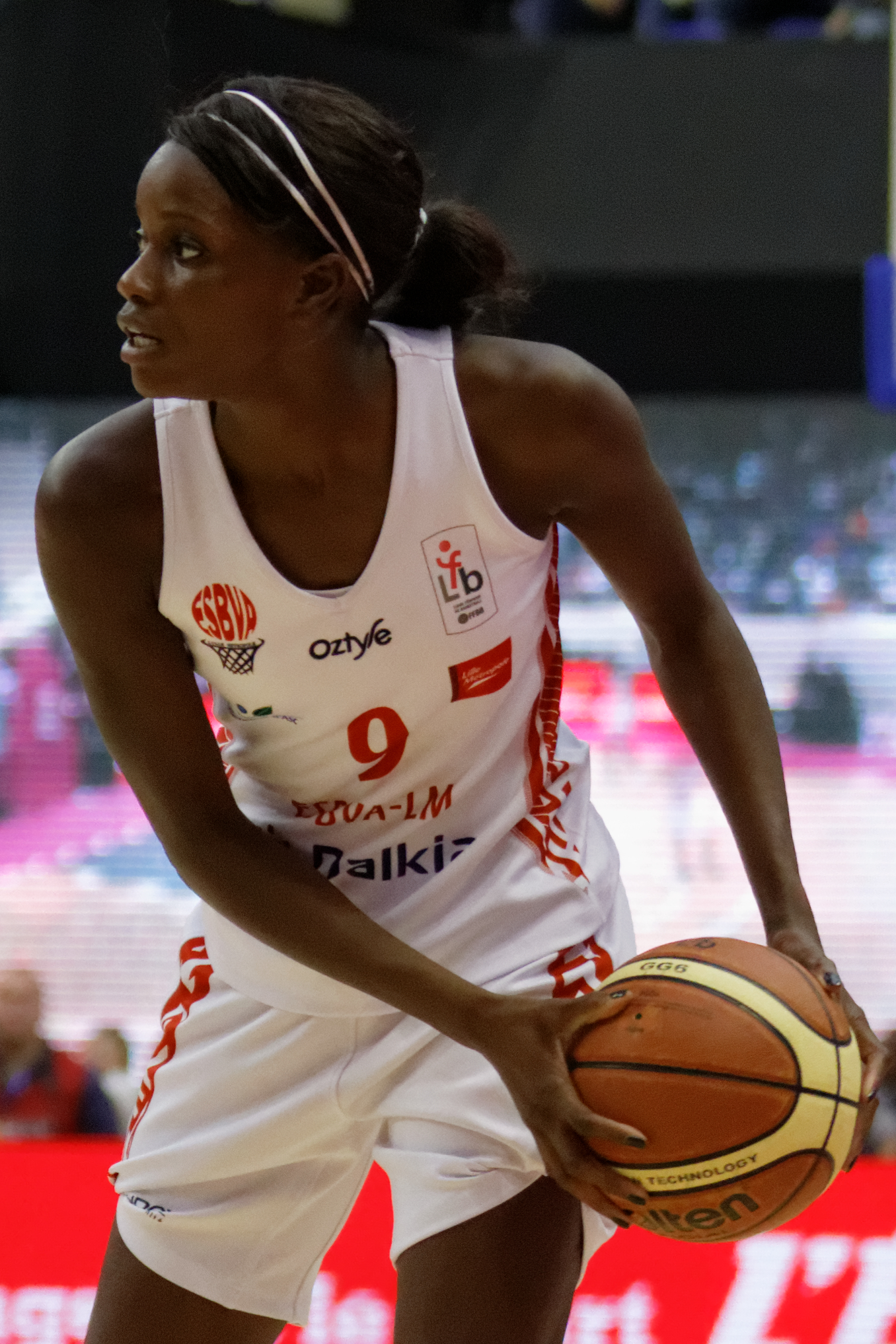
Gomis

Johanne Gomis (born 11 July 1985 in Nogent-sur-Marne, France) is a French basketball player. Gomis has had 15 selections on the French national women's basketball team since 2010.

She currently plays for the ESB Villeneuve-d'Ascq team.
