= Le Perreux-sur-Marne =

Le-Perreux-sur-Marne
- Commune
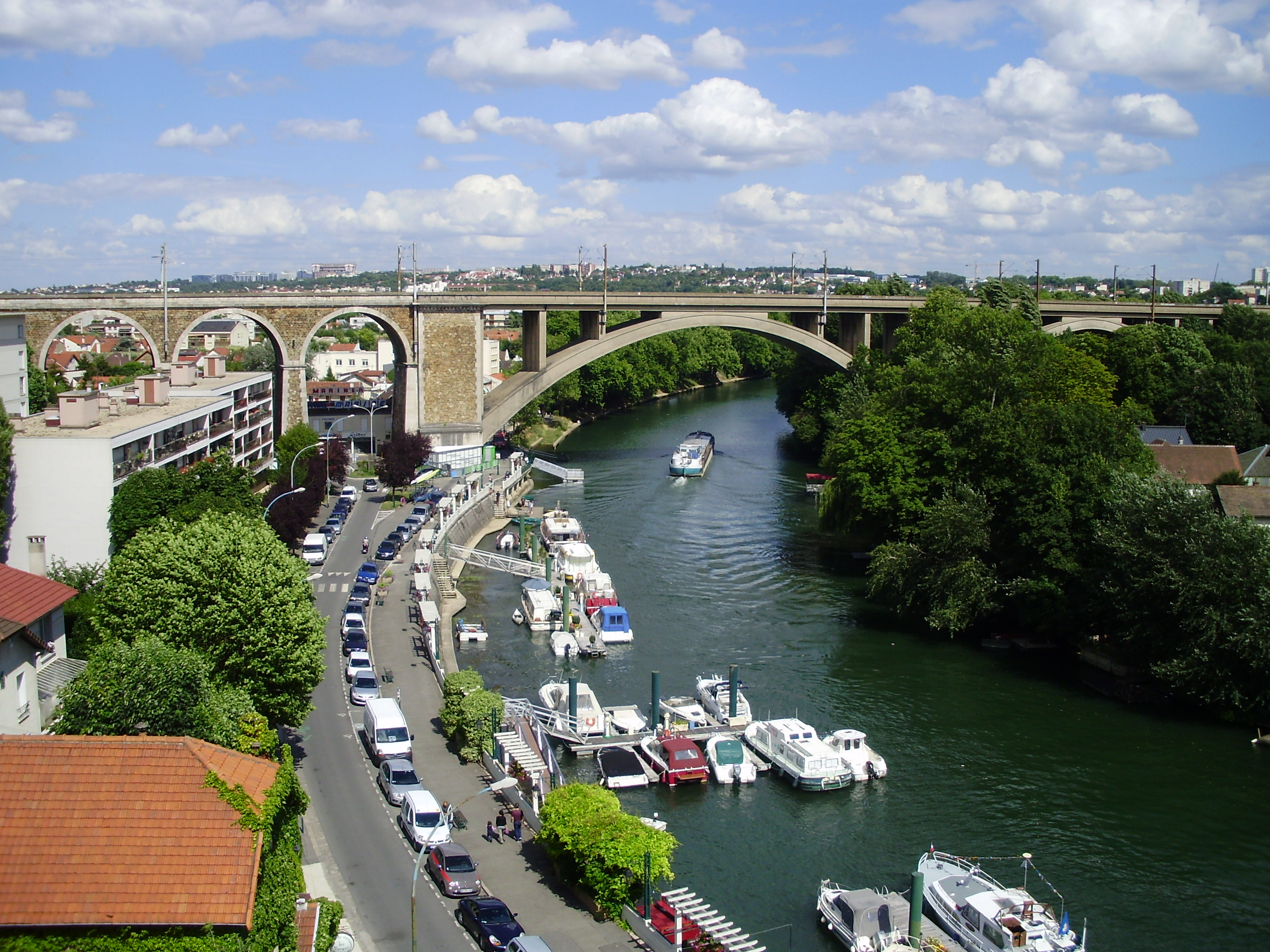
- The railway bridge in Nogent-sur-Marne

- Coat of arms

- Location (in red) within Paris inner suburbs
- Location of Le-Perreux-sur-Marne
- Location within France Location within Île-de-France (region)
- Coordinates: 48°50′32″N 2°30′13″E
- Country: France
- Region: Île-de-France
- Department: Val-de-Marne
- Arrondissement: Nogent-sur-Marne
- Canton: Nogent-sur-Marne
- Intercommunality: Grand Paris

Government
  - Mayor (2026–32): Christel Royer
- Area^{1}: 3.96 km^{2} (1.53 sq mi)
- Elevation: 33 m (108 ft)
- Population (2023): 35,260
  - Density: 8,900/km^{2} (23,100/sq mi)
- Time zone: UTC+01:00 (CET)
  - Summer (DST): UTC+02:00 (CEST)
- INSEE/Postal code: 94058 /94170
- ^{1} French Land Register data, which excludes lakes, ponds, glaciers > 1 km^{2} (0.386 sq mi or 247 acres) and river estuaries.

Le Perreux-sur-Marne (French pronunciation: [lə pɛʁø syʁ maʁn], lit. 'Le Perreux on Marne') is a commune in the Val-de-Marne department in the eastern suburbs of Paris, France. It is located 11.7 km (7.3 mi) from the center of Paris.

== Toponymy ==
The name Le Perreux derives from the name given to the area by the monks of the Abbey of Saint-Maur, Petrosa, derived from the Latin petra, meaning 'stone'.

== History ==
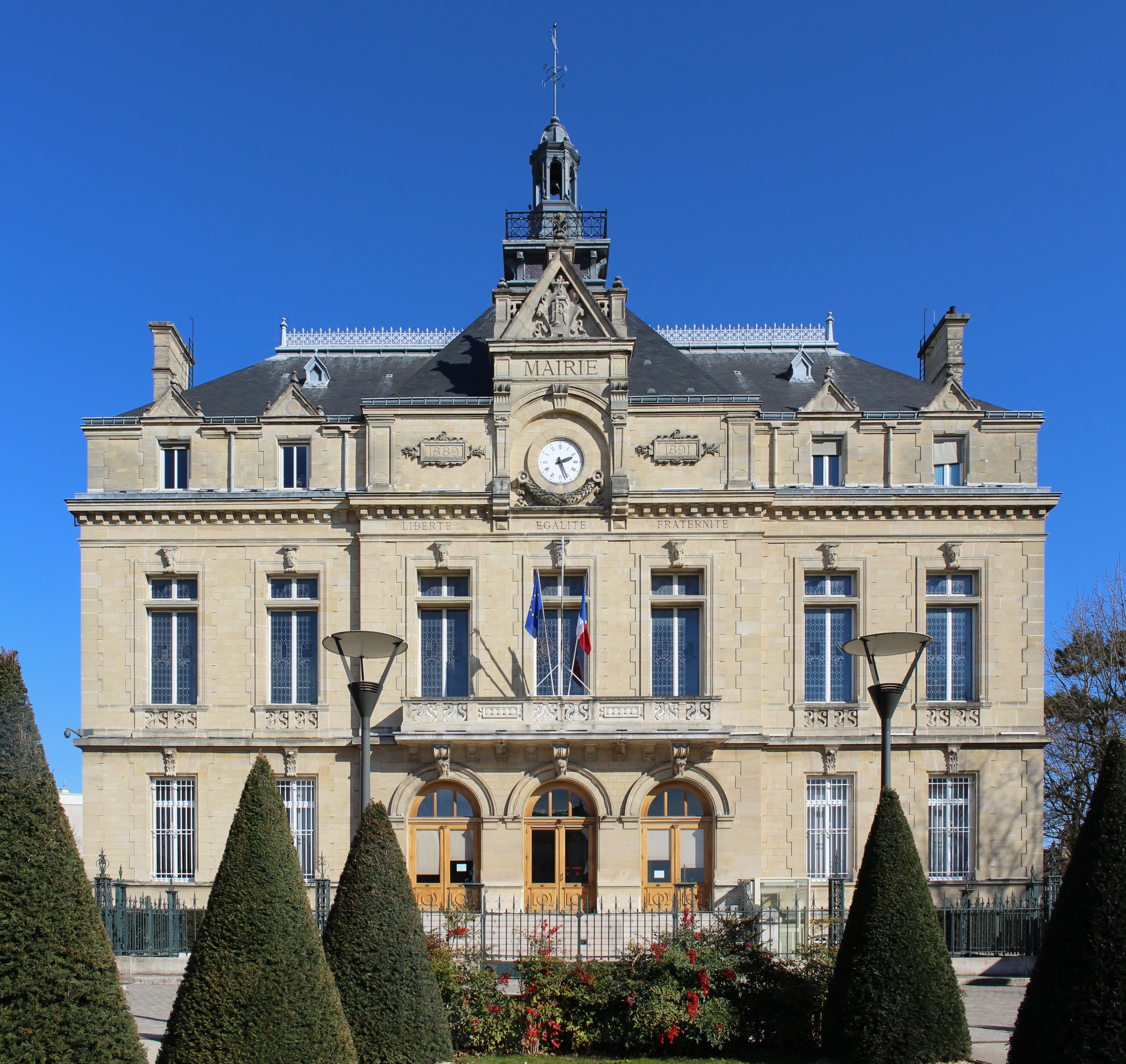
The Hôtel de Ville

The commune of Le Perreux-sur-Marne was created on 28 February 1887 by detaching its territory from the commune of Nogent-sur-Marne. The Hôtel de Ville was completed in 1891.

Historical population

Year	Pop.	±% p.a.
1891	6,699	—
1896	8,390	+4.60%
1901	11,149	+5.85%
1906	13,255	+3.52%
1911	15,971	+3.80%
1921	17,915	+1.16%
1926	20,429	+2.66%
1931	23,808	+3.11%
1936	23,553	−0.22%
1946	23,086	−0.20%
1954	26,745	+1.86%

Year	Pop.	±% p.a.
1962	27,900	+0.53%
1968	29,099	+0.70%
1975	28,333	−0.38%
1982	27,647	−0.35%
1990	28,477	+0.37%
1999	30,080	+0.61%
2007	32,100	+0.82%
2012	33,248	+0.71%
2017	33,879	+0.38%
2023	35,260	+0.67%

Source: EHESS and INSEE (1968-2023)

== Education ==
As of 2016 the municipal preschools had a total of 1,171 students and the municipal elementary schools had a total of 1,839 students.

Public preschools:

- Maternelle Les Thillards
- Maternelle Paul Doumer
- Maternelle Clemenceau
- Maternelle De Lattre
- Maternelle Jules Ferry

Public elementary schools:

- Élémentaire Pierre Brossolette
- Élémentaire Clemenceau A
- Élémentaire Clemenceau B
- Élémentaire Jules Ferry

There are two public junior high schools, Collège Pierre Brossolette and Collège de Lattre, as well as one public senior high school/sixth-form college: Lycée Polyvalent Paul Doumer.

Private schools:

- Les Coccinelles Montessori (preschool)
- Saint-Joseph (preschool and primary school)
- Notre Dame de toutes Grâces (preschool and primary school)

== Transport ==
Le Perreux-sur-Marne is served by :

Train RER :

- Nogent – Le Perreux station on Paris RER E on the southwest side of the city
- Neuilly-Plaisance station on Paris RER A on the northeast side of the city.

Bus :

- Line 113 to Nogent-sur-Marne and Chelles.
- Line 114 to Château de Vincennes and Gare du Raincy - Villemomble.
- Line 116 to Gare de Champigny and Gare de Rosny-Bois-Perrier.
- Line 116 to Gare de Champigny and Gare de Rosny-Bois-Perrier.
- Line 120 to Gare de Nogent-sur-Marne and Gare de Noisy-le-Grand / Mont d'Est.
- Line 210 to Château de Vincennes and Gare de Villiers-sur-Marne / Plessis-Trévise.
- Line 317 to Gare de Nogent-Le Perreux and Créteil Mairie.

Noctilien (Night Bus) :

Service between 12h30 AM et 05h30 AM.

- Line N34 Gare de Lyon - Torcy RER
- Line N35 Gare de Lyon - Nogent-Le Perreux RER
- Line N142 Gare de l'Est - Tournan RER

Car :

- By Trunk Road RN34 to Paris Porte de Vincennes.
- By Motorway of the East (Autoroute de l'Est A4 Connecting Paris to Metz, Exit Pont de Nogent.
- By the seconde Ring road around Paris A86 (sometimes called "Paris super-périphérique") and then The Motorway of the North A3 (Paris Porte de Bagnolet - Lille) .

== Twin Town ==
- Forchheim, Germany, since 1974.

== See also ==
- Communes of the Val-de-Marne department
- Marcel Gaumont. Sculptor of war memorial
