= Henri Lebègue =

French palaeographer

- Born: 27 February 1856; Nogent-sur-Marne
- Died: 26 March 1923 (aged 67); 5th arrondissement of Paris
- Occupation: Palaeographer
- Spouse: Jeanne Lhuillier

Henri Lebègue (27 February 1856 – 19 October 1938) was a French palaeographer, director of studies at the École pratique des hautes études.

The French historian Ernest Lebègue (1862–1943), was his brother. Henri Lebègue was also the father of literary historian Raymond Lebègue and nephew of publisher and media owner Alphonse-Nicolas Lebègue (1814–1885) from Brussels.

== Palaeographer and professor at the École pratique des hautes études ==
An officer of Public Instruction, attached to the library of the University of Paris (Sorbonne) from November 1882 to October 1888, Henri Lebègue wa admitted to the École pratique des hautes études in November 1891 as head of palaeographic studies. He joined the section of historical and philological sciences.

A researcher, Lebègue was also a translator and published texts by Greek authors related to the geography and history of Gaules. Henri Lebègue also wrote Greek exercise books. He listed and partly translated the Greek alchemical manuscripts kept in Paris (the Parisini).

His latest work was a new translation of the Treaty On the Sublime by Longinus, which was published after his death in 1939.

Henri Lebègue was made a chevalier of the Legion d'honneur in January 1923.

== Selected works ==
- 1878–1883: Extrait des auteurs grecs concernant la géographie et l'histoire des Gaules, with Edmond Cougny (trad.), Librairie Renouard,
- 1917: Glanures paléographiques, Imprimerie nationale
- 1924: Henri Lebègue, Catalogue des manuscrits alchimiques grecs : les Parisini, Lamertin
- 1939: Longinus (author) and Henri Lebègue (trans.), Du sublime, Les Belles Lettres, "Collection des universités de France. Série grecque"

== See also ==
- Longinus (literature)
- Palaeography
- École pratique des hautes études
