= Raymond Lebègue =

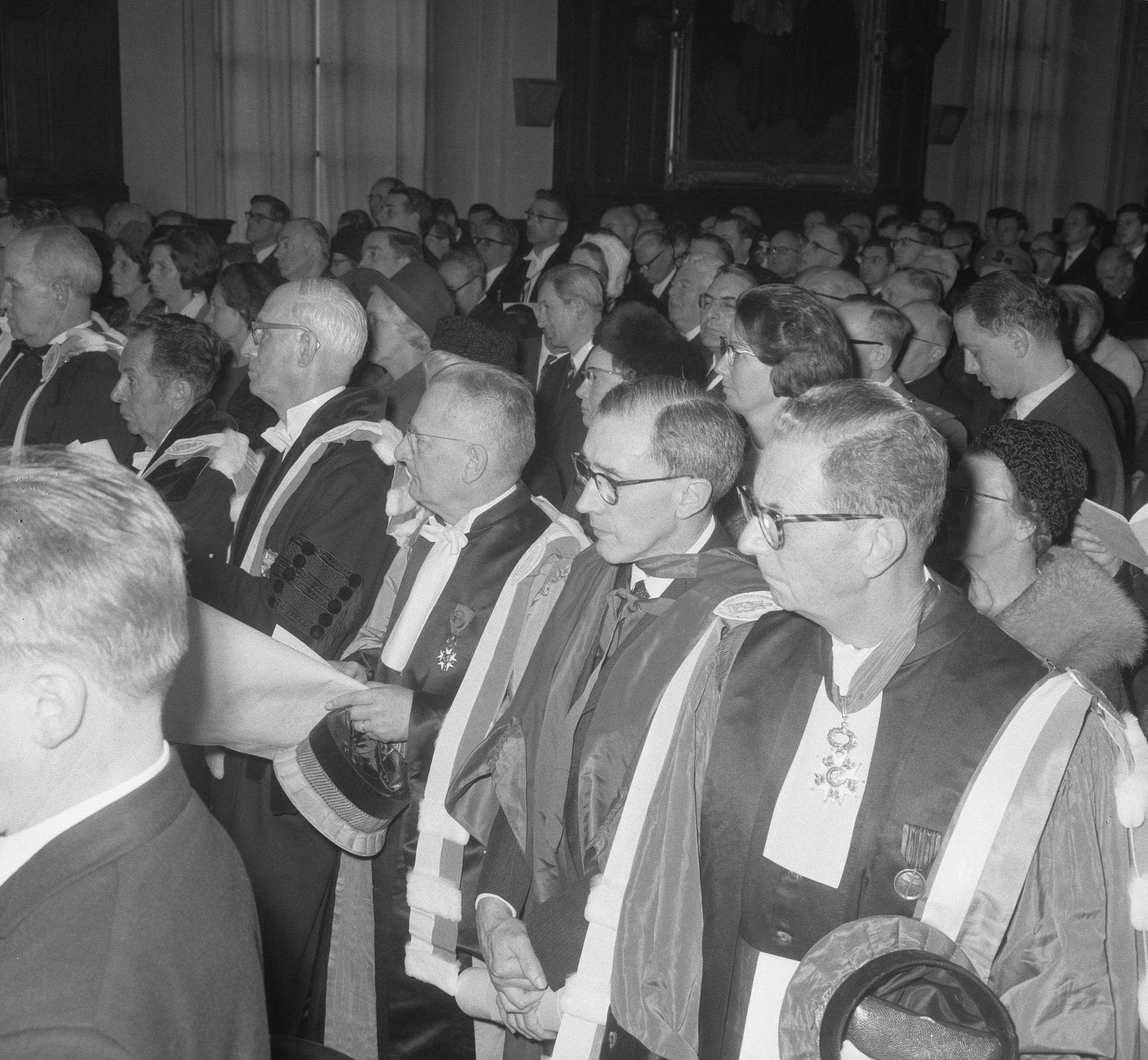
- Raymond Lebègue in Leuven (1966)
- Born: 16 August 1895; Paris
- Died: 21 November 1984 (aged 89); Paris
- Occupation: Historian

Raymond Lebègue (16 August 1895 – 21 November 1984) was a 20th-century French literary historian. The son of palaeographer Henri Lebègue, he was elected a member of the Académie des Inscriptions et Belles-Lettres in 1955.

He cofounded the Revue d'histoire du théâtre with his friend Louis Jouvet.

== Selected publications ==
- 1925: Stendhal, Armance ou quelques scènes d'un salon de Paris en 1827, Geneva/Paris 1986 (preface by André Gide)
- 1944: La Tragédie française de la Renaissance, Brüssel
- 1951: La Poésie française de 1560 à 1630. De Ronsard à Malherbe. Malherbe et son temps, 2 volumes, Paris 1945–1947
- 1949: Robert Garnier, Œuvres complètes
- 1966: Ronsard. L'homme et l'œuvre
- 1968: Malherbe, Oeuvres poétiques, with René Fromilhague)
- 1972: Le théâtre comique en France de "Pathelin à "Mélite"
- 1976: Peiresc, Lettres à Malherbe 1606–1628
- 1977–1978: Études sur le théâtre français, 2 volumes
- 1979: Aspects de Chateaubriand. Vie, voyage en Amérique, œuvres
