= Nogent-sur-Marne =

- Subprefecture and commune
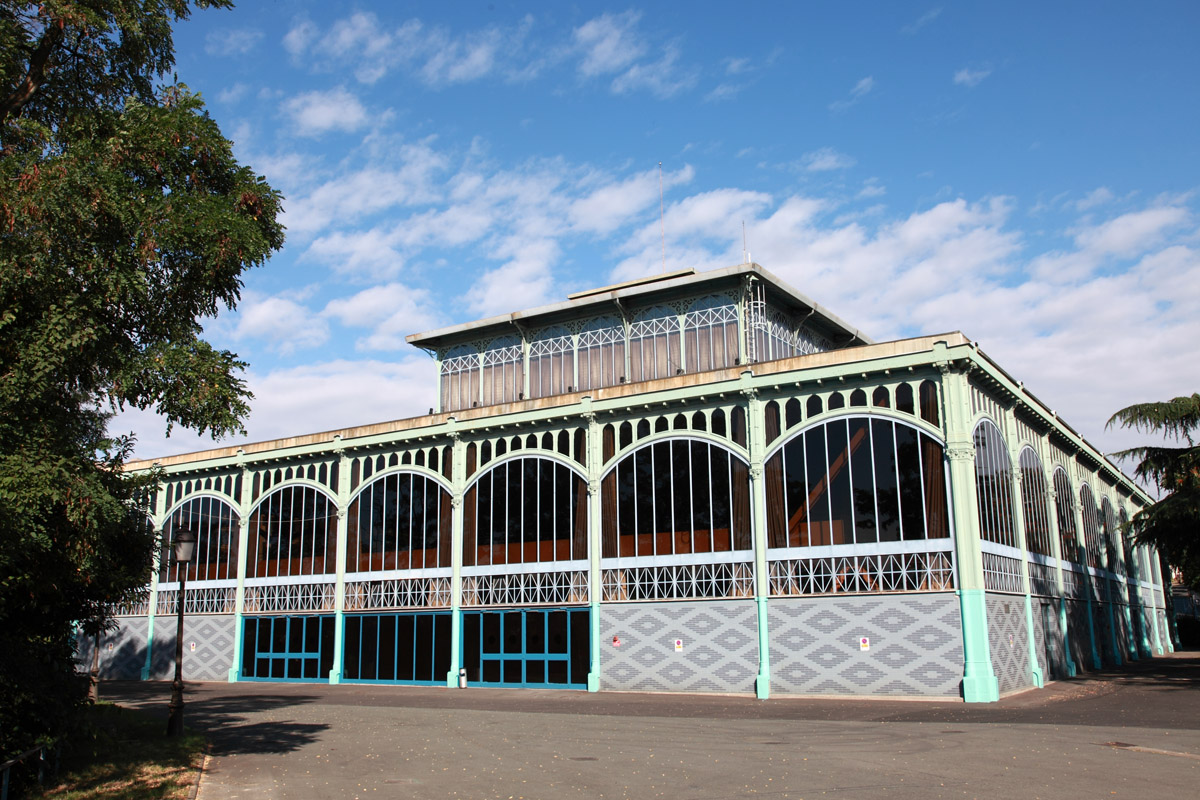
- The Pavillon Baltard

- Coat of arms

- Location (in red) within Paris inner suburbs
- Location of Nogent-sur-Marne
- Location within France Location within Île-de-France (region)
- Coordinates: 48°50′15″N 2°29′00″E
- Country: France
- Region: Île-de-France
- Department: Val-de-Marne
- Arrondissement: Nogent-sur-Marne
- Canton: Nogent-sur-Marne and Charenton-le-Pont
- Intercommunality: Grand Paris

Government
  - Mayor (2026–32): Gilles Hagege
- Area^{1}: 2.8 km^{2} (1.1 sq mi)
- Highest elevation: 99 m (325 ft)
- Lowest elevation: 36 m (118 ft)
- Population (2023): 32,455
  - Density: 12,000/km^{2} (30,000/sq mi)
- Time zone: UTC+01:00 (CET)
  - Summer (DST): UTC+02:00 (CEST)
- INSEE/Postal code: 94052 /94130
- ^{1} French Land Register data, which excludes lakes, ponds, glaciers > 1 km^{2} (0.386 sq mi or 247 acres) and river estuaries.

Nogent-sur-Marne (French pronunciation: [nɔʒɑ̃ syʁ maʁn]) is a commune in the eastern suburbs of Paris, France. It is located 10.6 km (6.6 mi) from the centre of Paris. Nogent-sur-Marne is a sous-préfecture of the Val-de-Marne département, being the seat of the Arrondissement of Nogent-sur-Marne.

== History ==
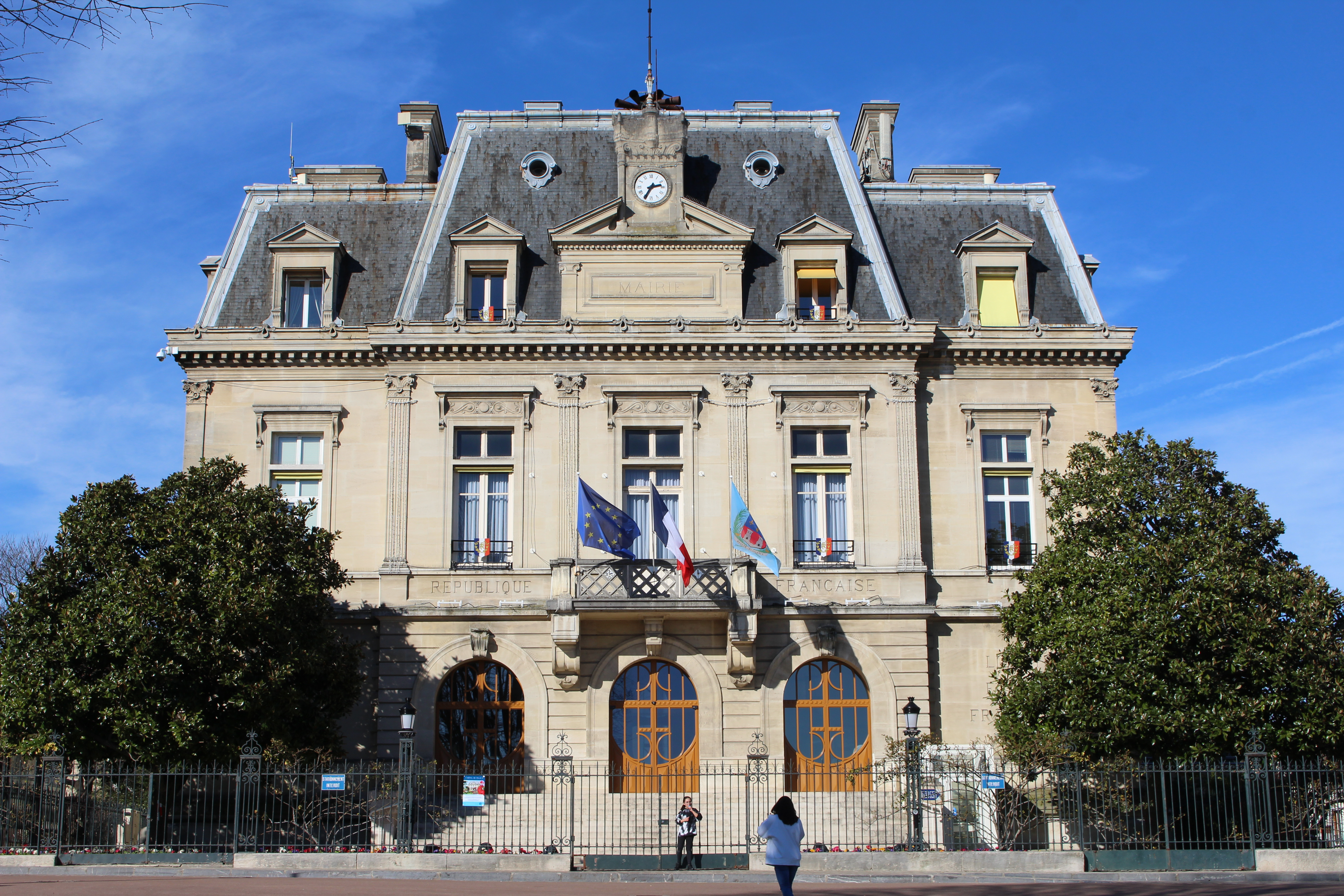
The Hôtel de Ville

Several origins of the name have been proposed:

- Novigentum, "new people", i.e. prisoners brought by the Roman armies.
- Nov. indicates fatty or soaked grounds.
- Novientum which is the Gallic equivalent of medieval French "Villeneuve" or English "Newtown".

In the Middle Ages, several castles were built. Le Château de Plaisance was built in the 13th century and hosted Charles V and Jeanne de Bourbon in 1375. The only vestige which remains is a house of the current private hospital, 30 rue de Plaisance, as well as the bottom of the enclosing wall of the gardens. Le Château de Beauté-sur-Marne, 14th century, is a royal stay. Cardinal de Richelieu destroyed it in 1626.

In the 17th century, whereas the rural population was made up of a majority of vine growers, the middle-class discovered the charms of the country, and settled in Nogent. Jean-Antoine Watteau lived in Mr. Lefevre's house his last moments and died there in 1721.

The construction of the two railway lines: Paris–Mulhouse and Bastille–La Varenne in the 1850s still accelerated the process. The viaduct, built by Auvergnats and Belgians was destroyed once on 15 September 1870. Italians rebuilt it; an Italian community was established there. Coming, for the majority, from the province of Piacenza, they were from the Valley of Nure or from the south of Tyrol.

The Hôtel de Ville was completed in 1879 and on the edge of the town is Paris' Tropical Agronomy Garden.

Isolated since 1854 by the construction of a viaduct for the Paris–Mulhouse line, the commune of Le Perreux sur Marne was born after a fight of more than 10 years in 1887. On 28 February 1887, more than half of the territory of Nogent-sur-Marne was detached and became the commune of Le Perreux-sur-Marne.

In 1929, the commune of Nogent-sur-Marne lost a small part of its territory when the city of Paris annexed the Bois de Vincennes, the eastern fringe of which belonged to Nogent-sur-Marne.

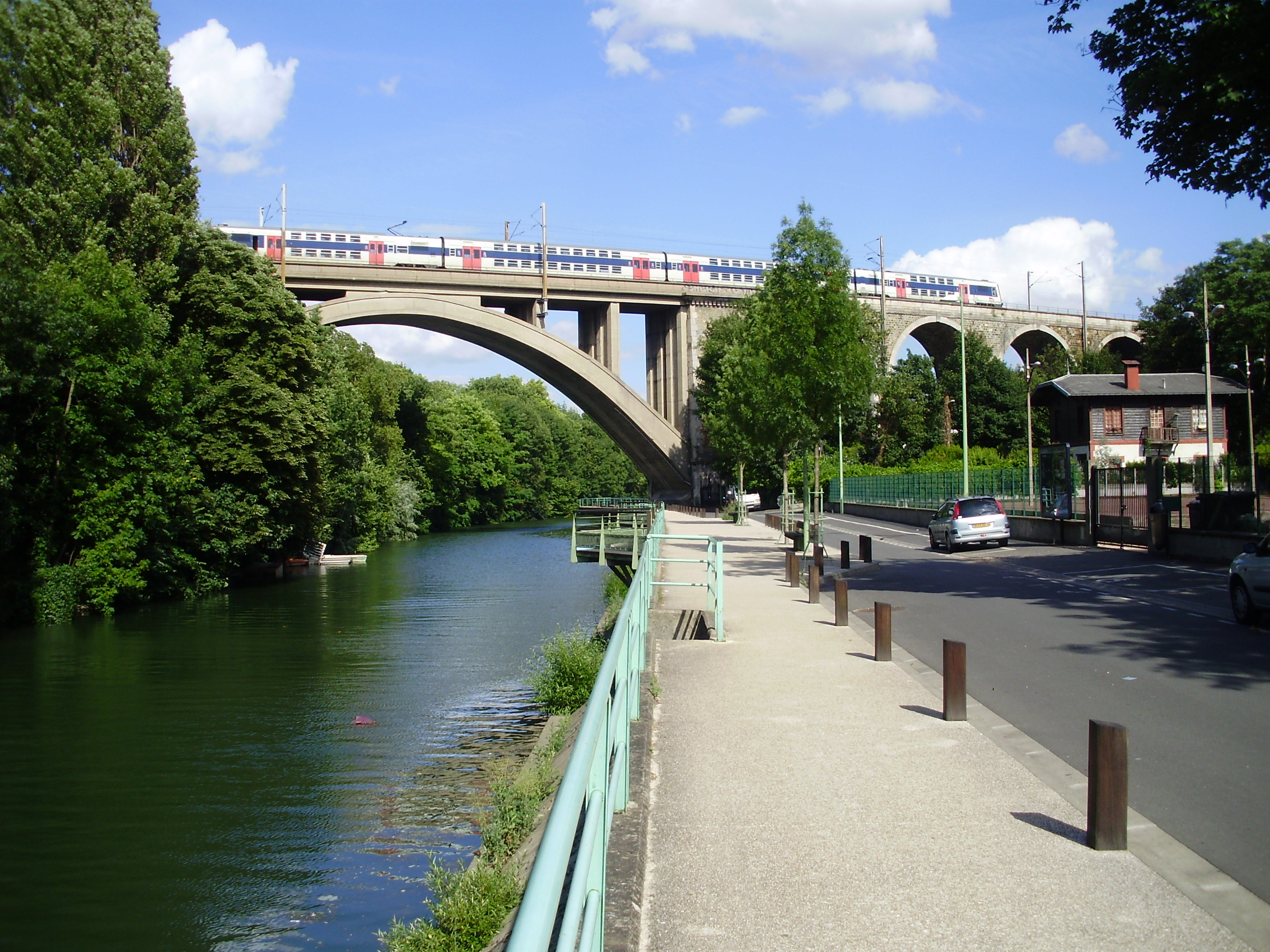
Railway bridge of Nogent-sur-Marne

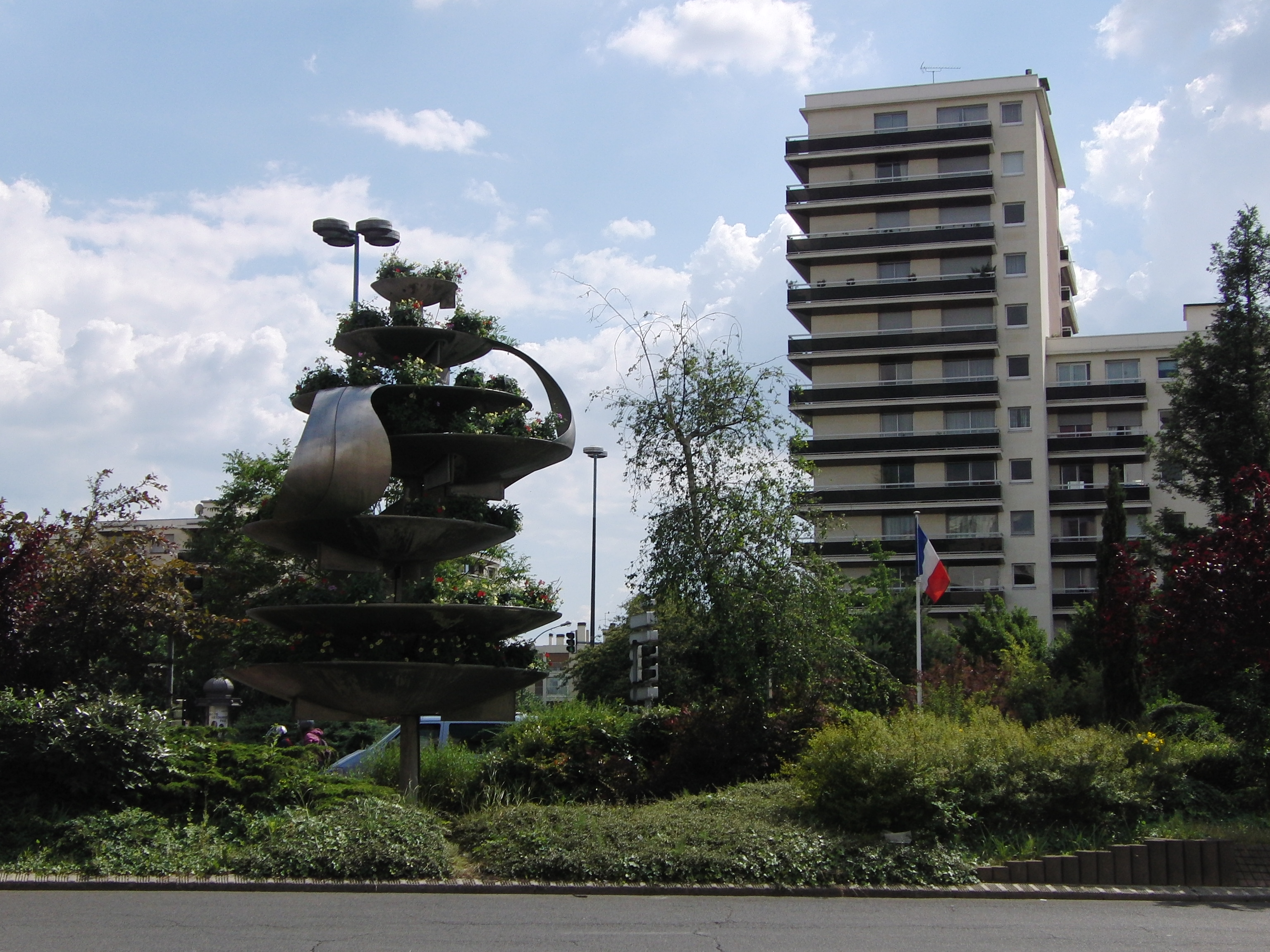
Nogent-sur-Marne, Place Leclerc

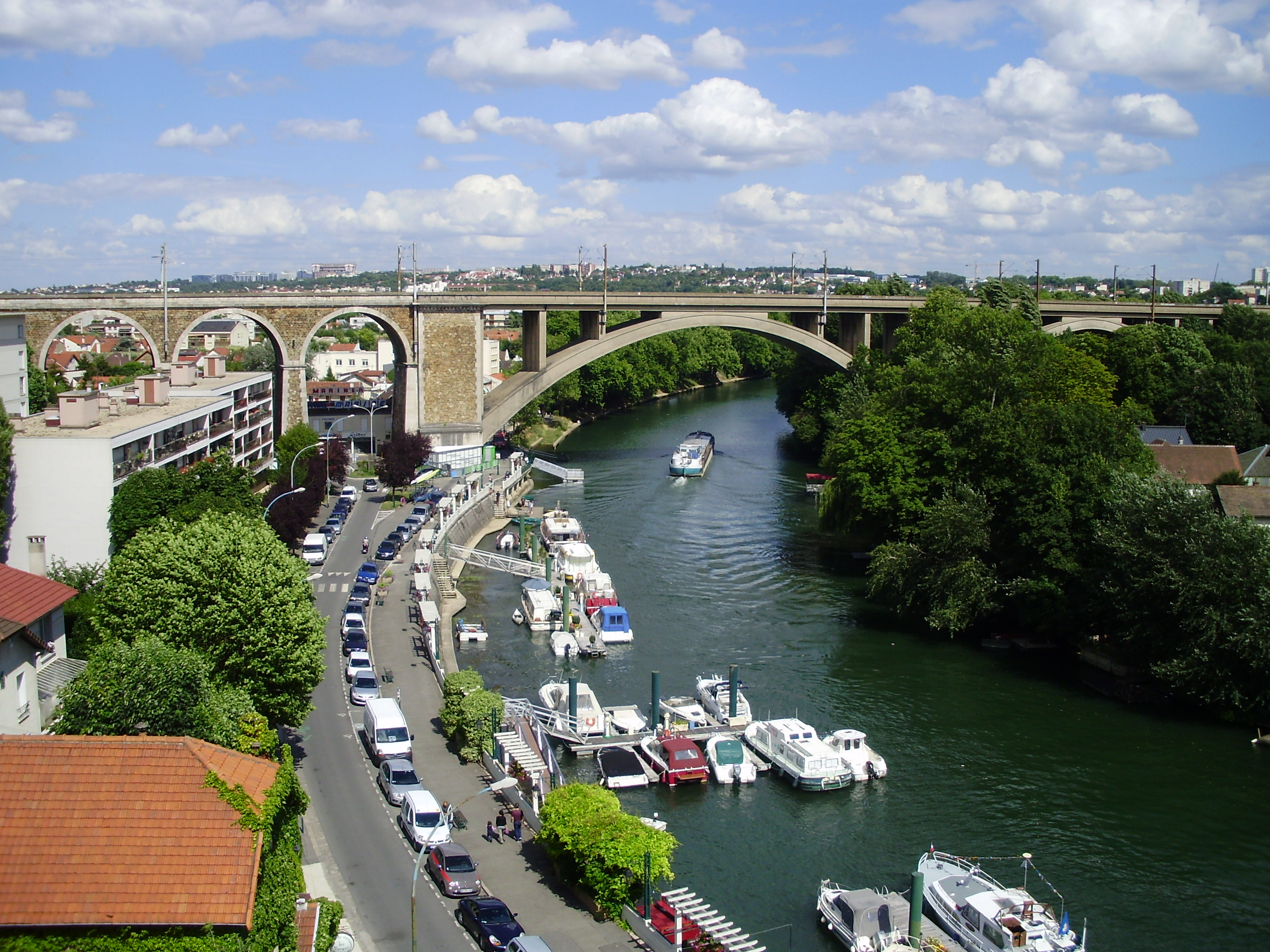
Railway bridge of Nogent-sur-Marne

== Population ==
Historical population

Year	Pop.	±% p.a.
1793	1,198	—
1800	1,256	+0.68%
1806	1,004	−3.66%
1821	1,170	+1.03%
1831	1,201	+0.26%
1836	1,496	+4.49%
1841	1,828	+4.09%
1846	1,996	+1.77%
1851	2,104	+1.06%
1856	2,551	+3.93%
1861	3,563	+6.91%
1866	4,976	+6.91%
1872	6,264	+3.91%
1876	7,559	+4.81%
1881	9,491	+4.66%
1886	12,972	+6.45%
1891	8,399	−8.33%
1896	9,413	+2.31%
1901	10,586	+2.38%

Year	Pop.	±% p.a.
1906	11,721	+2.06%
1911	14,051	+3.69%
1921	17,464	+2.20%
1926	19,765	+2.51%
1931	21,324	+1.53%
1936	21,056	−0.25%
1946	21,547	+0.23%
1954	23,581	+1.13%
1962	24,501	+0.48%
1968	26,238	+1.15%
1975	25,634	−0.33%
1982	24,630	−0.57%
1990	25,248	+0.31%
1999	28,191	+1.23%
2007	30,912	+1.16%
2012	30,884	−0.02%
2017	32,851	+1.24%
2023	32,455	−0.20%

Source: EHESS and INSEE (1968-2023)

== International relations ==
Nogent-sur-Marne is twinned with:

- Bolesławiec, Poland
- Nazaré, Portugal
- Siegburg, Germany
- Val Nure, Italy
- Yverdon-les-Bains, Switzerland

The commune also has agreements of friendship and co-operation with:

- Figueira da Foz, Portugal
- Jezzine, Lebanon
- Kyzylorda, Kazakhstan
- (Israel) Metula, Israël
- Nouvion-le-Vineux, France

== Transport ==
- Subway (RER):
  - Nogent-sur-Marne station on Paris RER line
  - Nogent – Le Perreux station on Paris RER line
- Buses:
  - 116 (Rosny-sous-Bois - RER Val-de-Fontenay - Champigny - Saint-Maur RER)
  - 114 (Gare du Raincy-Villemonble - Château de Vincennes)
  - 113 (Nogent - Chelles)
  - 120 (Nogent - Noisy-le-Grand Mont d'Est ou Mairie)
  - 210 (Château de Vincennes - Gare de Villiers)
  - 317 (Nogent Gare SNCF - Créteil Hôtel de Ville),
- N35 (Night Bus) (Gare de Lyon (75) ↔ Nogent-le-Perreux RER).
- Autoroutes:
  - A 4 (Paris ↔ East of France, forms part of E25 and E50)
  - A 86 (Paris Super-Périphérique)
    - both at 03 - A4–A86 Junction, Nogent-sur-Marne
- N 34
- by boat, by Marne, from Paris.

== Education ==
The commune has the following public preschools and primary schools:

- Preschools: Fontenay, Gallieni, Val de Beauté, Paul Bert, and Guy Môquet
- Elementary schools: Paul Bert, Guy Môquet, Val de Beauté
- School groups (combined preschool and elementary school): Léonard de Vinci and Victor Hugo

The commune has two public junior high schools, Collège Watteau and Collège Branly. Collège Pierre Brossolette is in nearby Le Perreux. The commune has two public academic high schools/sixth-form colleges, Lycée Branly and Lycée Louis Armand, as well as two vocational high schools, La Source and Val de Beauté.

Private schools:

- Lycée Albert-de-Mun
- Institut Montalembert

Bibliothèque Cavanna serves as the municipal library.

== Notable people ==
=== Famous people born in Nogent-sur-Marne ===
- Kareen Antonn, singer
- Emile Armet de Lisle, industrialist and chemist
- Jacques de Sieyes, WWI hero, activist
- Noura Ben Slama, handball player
- Mamadi Berthe, footballer
- Cindy Billaud, athlete
- François Cavanna, author and satirical newspaper editor
- Émilie Deleuze, film director
- Auguste Dussourd, squash player
- Coralie Demay, racing cyclist
- Thierry Escaich, organist and composer
- Stéphane Galifi, squash player
- Patrice Gerges, Paralympic athlete
- Jean Giraud, comics artist
- Mélissa Gomes, footballer
- Johanne Gomis, basketball player
- Magaye Gueye, footballer
- Jean-Jacques Guissart, rower
- Cloé Hache, swimmer
- Loic Korval, judoka
- Stephane Lambese, footballer
- Henri Lebègue, palaeographer
- Stéphane Lecat, long-distance swimmer
- Romain Le Gac, ice dancer
- Philippe Louviot, cyclist
- Louis Massignon, academic and scholar of Islamic studies
- Bertrand de Montaudoüin, athlete and soldier
- Maria Murano, opera singer
- Lilian Nalis, footballer
- Pierre Oster, poet
- Jeff Panacloc, ventriloquist
- Pierre Papadiamandis, pianist and songwriter
- Michel-Marie Poulain, painter
- Cécile Rigaux, beach volleyball player
- Jacques Sablon, actor
- Jean Sablon, singer and actor
- Baïssama Sankoh, footballer
- Franck Signorino, footballer
- Amadou Soukouna, footballer
- Félix Trombe, engineer and physicist
- Christian Vander, musician
- Maxime Vachier-Lagrave, chess grandmaster
- Marc Vignal, musicologist
- Nicolas Taravel, footballer

=== Lived in or associated with Nogent-sur-Marne ===
- André Bazin, film critic and theorist
- Jules Benoit-Lévy, painter and engraver
- Bérurier Noir, punk rock band
- Maurice Boitel, painter
- Mathieu Boogaerts, singer and songwriter
- Benjamin Castaldi, television host
- Arlette Chabot, journalist
- Zhang Chongren, sculptor and friend of Hergé
- Paul Colin, graphic artist and illustrator
- Ciryl Gane, mixed martial artist
- Marcel Gimond, sculptor
- Yvette Horner, accordionist and pianist
- Daniel du Janerand, painter
- Maxime Lalanne, painter
- Alexandre Langlois, indologist
- Clément Michu, actor
- Tony Muréna, accordionist and composer
- Pierre Pincemaille, organist
- Lazare Ponticelli, veteran of the First World War
- Jules Rossi, cyclist
- Michel Rousseau, swimmer
- Charles Trenet, singer and songwriter
- Jean-Baptiste Philibert Vaillant, military commander
- Laurent Voulzy, singer and songwriter
- Antoine Watteau, painter
- Raoul Dufy, painter
- Mustafa Shokay, kazakh social and political activist

== See also ==
- Communes of the Val-de-Marne department
- Les Halles
