= Inscription of Abercius =

Greek epitaph of Abercius

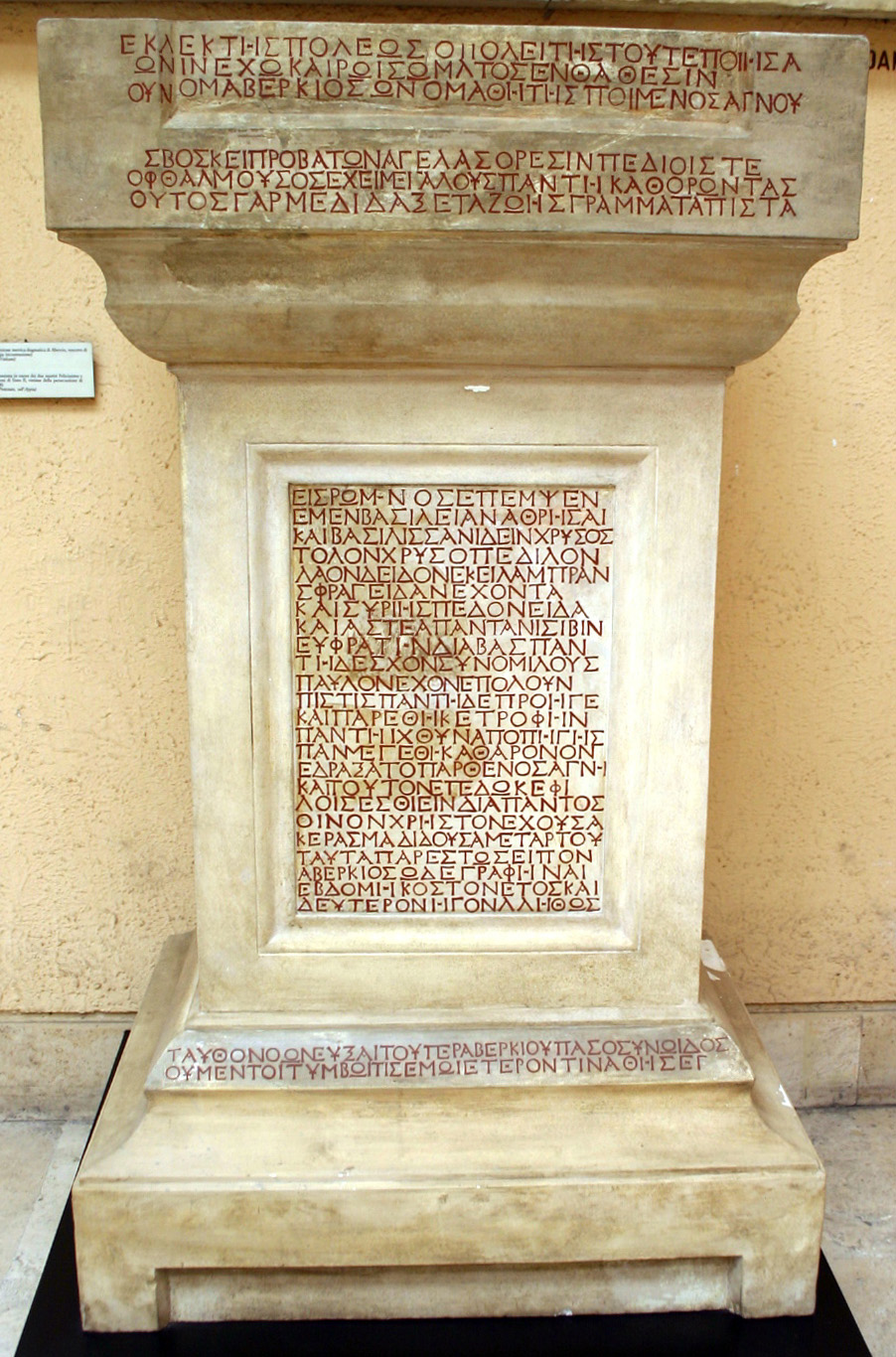
A cast of the epitaph of Abercius

The inscription of Abercius is the Greek epitaph of Abercius who was probably Bishop of Hieropolis in Phrygia. It is an important example of early Christian epigraphy.

== Archaeology and context ==
In the second half of the 2nd century, Abercius left Hieropolis and visited Rome. Later he travelled through Syria and Mesopotamia, where an ecclesiastical network seems to have already existed. He died back home in Hieropolis after having composed his own epitaph. This text gives an impression of his self-perception and identity as a clergyman. This epitaph may have been a main inspiration for the Life of Abercius transmitted in later manuscripts, since the information contained therein can well be explained by the hints contained in the inscription or by common stereotypes for the lives of saints.

Indeed, the Life includes a full transcription of the epitaph. Prior to the late 19th century, scholars such as Louis-Sébastien Le Nain de Tillemont and Jean Baptiste Francois Pitra tried to prove the authenticity of this transcribed inscription, while Ernest Renan regarded it as completely invented. However, in 1882 the Scottish archaeologist William Mitchell Ramsay discovered at Kelendres, near Synnada, in the Roman province of Phrygia Salutaris (in modern Anatolia), a Christian gravestone dated to the year 300 of the Phrygian era (216 AD). The gravestone belonged to a certain Alexander, son of Anthony. Giovanni Battista de Rossi and Louis Duchesne immediately recognized that the wording corresponded, almost word for word, parts of the epitaph quoted in the Life of Abercius. On a second visit to the site of Hieropolis, a year later, Ramsay discovered two fragments of another inscription, built into the public baths. They belonged to another gravestone, but included as well some parts of the epitaph of Abercius as transmitted in the Life. These fragments are now in the Vatican Museum.

== Reconstructed epitaph ==
The citizen of a chosen city, this [monument] I made [while] living, that there I might have in time a resting-place of my body, [I] being by name Abercius, the disciple of a holy shepherd who feeds flocks of sheep [both] on mountains and on plains, who has great eyes that see everywhere. For this [shepherd] taught me [that the] book [of life] is worthy of belief. And to Rome he sent me to contemplate majesty, and to see a queen golden-robed and golden-sandalled; there also I saw a people bearing a shining mark. And I saw the land of Syria and all [its] cities; Nisibis [I saw] when I passed over Euphrates. But everywhere I had brethren. I had Paul ... Faith everywhere led me forward, and everywhere provided as my food a fish of exceeding great size, and perfect, which a holy virgin drew with her hands from a fountain and this it [faith] ever gives to its friends to eat, it having wine of great virtue, and giving it mingled with bread. These things I, Abercius, having been a witness [of them] told to be written here. Verily I was passing through my seventy-second year. He that discerneth these things, every fellow-believer [namely], let him pray for Abercius. And no one shall put another grave over my grave; but if he do, then shall he pay to the treasury of [the] Romans two thousand pieces of gold and to my good native city of Hieropolis one thousand pieces of gold.

== Theories and conclusions ==
The interpretation of the Abercius inscription has stimulated animated controversies. In 1894 G. Ficker, supported by Otto Hirschfeld, tried to prove that Abercius was a priest of the mother goddess Cybele, In 1895 Adolf von Harnack tried to explain Abercius as a representative of a religious syncretism. In 1896, Albrecht Dieterich tried to prove that Abercius had been a priest of Attis. These theories were refuted by several archaeologists and theologists such as Armand Abel and Franz Joseph Dölger.

Linguistic and paleographic details show that the epitaph of Abercius is as older than that of Alexander, i.e. prior to the year 216 AD. Abercius himself may be identified with a writer named Avircius Marcellus, mentioned by Eusebius as the author of a work against Montanism. As that treatise was written in the later second century AD, the identity of this author with Abercius of Hieropolis is indeed possible.

Abercius was a high clergyman of a little town, the name of which is wrongly given in some sections of the Life, since he belongs to Hieropolis in Phrygia Salutaris, and not to Hierapolis in Phrygia Pacatiensis. Whether the episcopate already existed across the board at the time of Aberkios is disputed. It is therefore unclear whether he himself held this title. The text of the inscription is particularly important regarding the symbolism of the early church. Abercius himself seems to have been proud of his sophisticated formulations and metaphor-rich language, as he emphasises that he wrote the inscription himself.

The middle part of the inscription describes Abercius' journeys to Rome, Syria and Mesopotamia. The metaphors included in this sentences are not yet fully understood. Whether the "queen golden-robed and golden-sandalled" is a member of the Roman imperial family, refers to the city of Rome itself as the "queen of the world" or is to be interpreted as a metaphor for the Catholic Church is a matter of debate. The "people bearing a shining mark" that Abercius claims to have seen in Rome is generally interpreted as the christian community there, the "mark" (or "seal") being a common metaphor for the baptism. Regarding his later journeys to Syria and Mesopotamia, Abercius mentions the Apostle Paul as his companion. As the apostle, or rather his writings, became an important authority in the theological debates of the 2nd century, this remark could give an indication of the purpose of the journeys. The vita of the saint suggests as well that Abercius wanted to defend the "true faith" on his travels and take action against Marconism.

The inscription is cited as evidence of the following in second-century Christianity:

1. the importance of the church of Rome
2. the practice of baptism
3. the reception of the Eucharist
4. the practice of praying for the dead.

The liturgical cultus of Abercius presents no point of special interest; his name appears for the first time in the Greek menologies and synaxaries of the 10th century, but is not found in the Martyrology of St. Jerome.

== Bibliography ==
- Blank, Annkatrin (2023). Die Grabinschrift des Aberkios: ein Kommentar. Regensburg: Schnell & Steiner. ISBN 9783795438609.
