= Uccle =

Municipality of the Brussels-Capital Region, Belgium

Uccle: Uccle (French); Ukkel (Dutch)
- Municipality
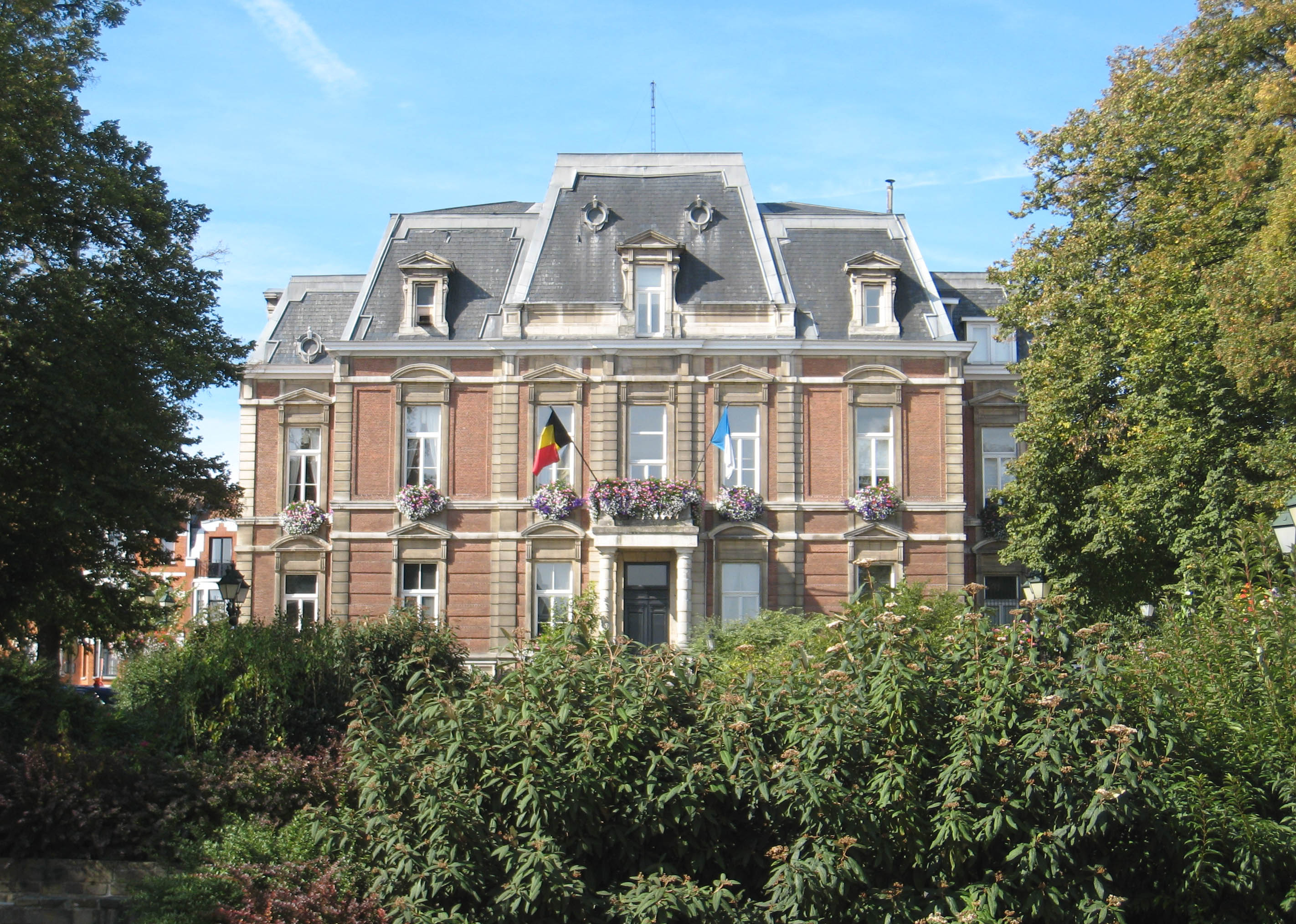
- Uccle's Municipal Hall

- Flag Coat of arms

- Uccle municipality in the Brussels-Capital Region
- Interactive map of Uccle
- Location in Belgium
- Coordinates: 50°48′N 04°20′E
- Country: Belgium
- Community: Flemish Community; French Community
- Region: Brussels-Capital
- Arrondissement: Brussels-Capital

Government
  - Mayor: Valentine Delwart (MR)
  - Governing parties: MR, Ecolo, Les Engagés

Area
  - Total: 22.87 km^{2} (8.83 sq mi)

Population (2020-01-01)
  - Total: 83,980
  - Density: 3,672/km^{2} (9,511/sq mi)
- Postal codes: 1180
- NIS code: 21016
- Area codes: 02
- Website: www.uccle.be/fr (in French) www.uccle.be/nl (in Dutch)

Uccle (French, pronounced [ykl(ə)]) or Ukkel (Dutch, pronounced [ˈʏkəl]) is one of the 19 municipalities of the Brussels-Capital Region, Belgium. Located in the southern part of the region, it is bordered by the City of Brussels, Forest, Ixelles, and Watermael-Boitsfort, as well as the Flemish municipalities of Drogenbos, Linkebeek and Sint-Genesius-Rode. Like all municipalities in Brussels, it is officially bilingual (French–Dutch).

As of 1 January 2022, the municipality had a population of 85,099 inhabitants. The total area is 22.87 km^{2} (8.83 sq mi), which gives a population density of 3,720/km^{2} (9,600/sq mi), half the average of Brussels. It is generally considered an affluent area of the region, and is particularly noted for its community of French immigrants.

== History ==
=== Origins and medieval times ===
According to legend, Uccle's Church of St. Peter was dedicated by Pope Leo III in the year 803, with Charlemagne and Gerbald, Bishop of Liège, attending the ceremony. During the following centuries, several noble families built their manors and took residency there. The first mention of the name Woluesdal, now evolved into Wolvendael, dates from 1209. In 1467, Isabella of Portugal, wife of Philip the Good, Duke of Burgundy, founded a Franciscan convent on Uccle's territory. Later, Uccle became the judiciary capital of the area including Brussels. Throughout the early stages of its history, however, the village of Uccle always had a predominantly rural character and lived mostly from the products of forestry and agriculture.

=== Lordship of Stalle ===
A large part of the territory of modern-day Uccle used to be part of the Lordship of Stalle, in addition to the old village of Uccle and the barony of Carloo. The first Lords of Stalle (High Justiciaries) were: Henri de Stalle, knight (died before 1357); Florent de Stalle, his son, alderman of Brussels in 1319 and knight, who married Lady Aleyde; and Florent de Stalle, knight and alderman of Brussels in 1357, member of the Seven Noble Houses of Brussels. It was he who, with his brother Daniel, founded the Stalle chapel and gave it lands.

Dependent fiefs of the Lordship of Stalle included the Fief of Overhem and the Fief of the Roetaert. The Fief of Overhem was located between the Dieweg and Stalle; it had a manor, a mill called Clipmolen, woods, and a pasture. However, in 1465, Marguerite Hinckaert, wife of Louis de Mailly, obtained from the sovereign the annexation of this fief to the Lordship of Stalle. The Fief of the Roetaert was located in Neerstalle, between the Kersbeek Wood and the Ukkelbeek. Its surface amounted to 39.78 acres of land and meadows and it included the manor of Roetaert. (Note: It belonged successively to: 1) Demoiselle Anne Marie Pauwels, widow of Sieur Henri van Nijs, per purchase on 19 July 1692 from the heirs of Guillaume Lemmens. 2) Lambert van der Meulen, husband of Élisabeth Cosyns, per purchase from the heirs of François Opdenbosch, on 22 November 1718. 3) Lambert Benoît François van der Meulen, his son, after his father's death. 4) Demoiselle Élisabeth van der Meulen (1720–1769), wife of Sieur Jean-Baptiste van Dievoet (1704–1776), on 24 October 1754. 5) François-Joseph van Dievoet (1754–1795) after his mother's death on 11 December 1769. 6) Demoiselle Marie Élisabeth van Dievoet (1752–1828), wife of Sieur Charles Marie Joseph Leyniers (1756–1822) per purchase from her brother François Joseph van Dievoet on 24 November 1784, ten years before the end of the Ancien Régime in modern day Belgium.)

=== 18th century until today ===
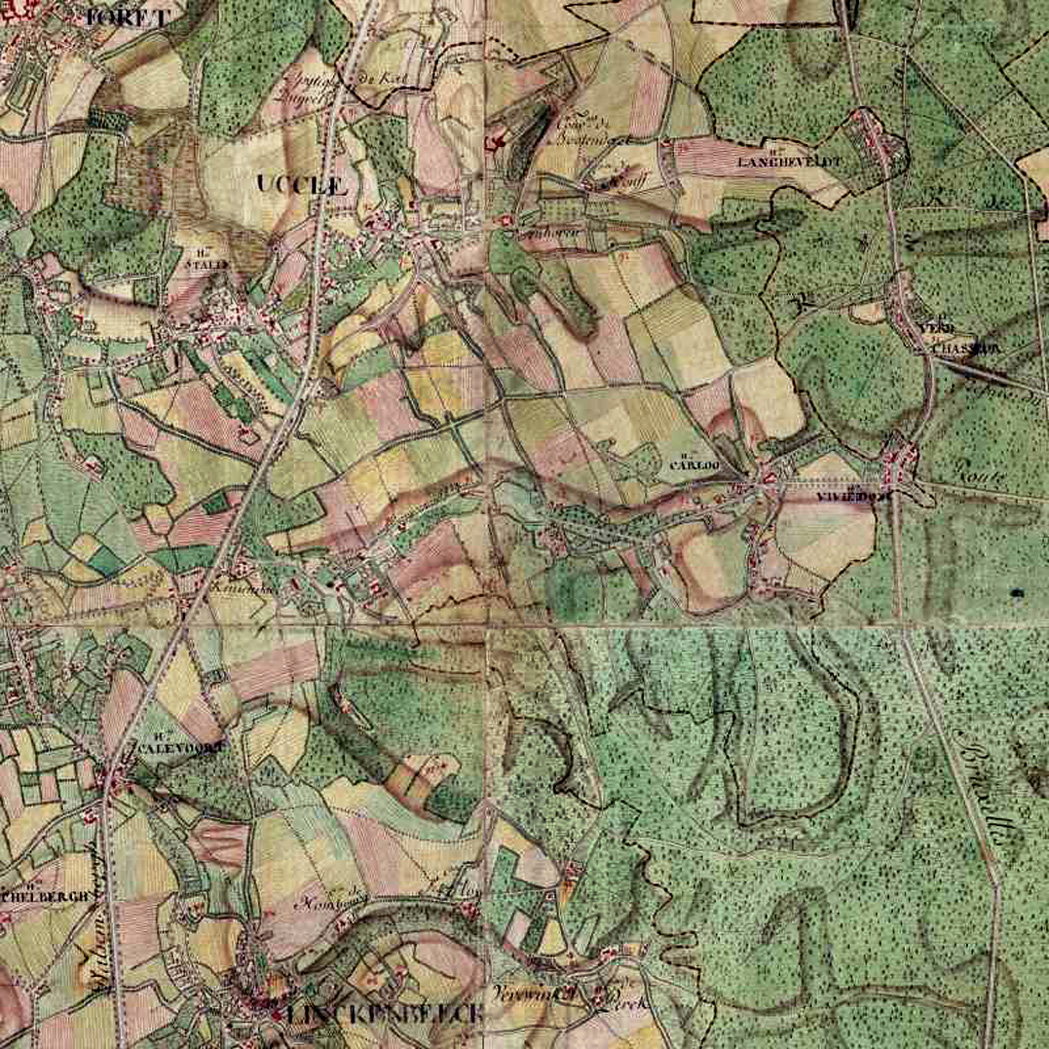
The village of Uccle marked on the 18th-century Ferraris map

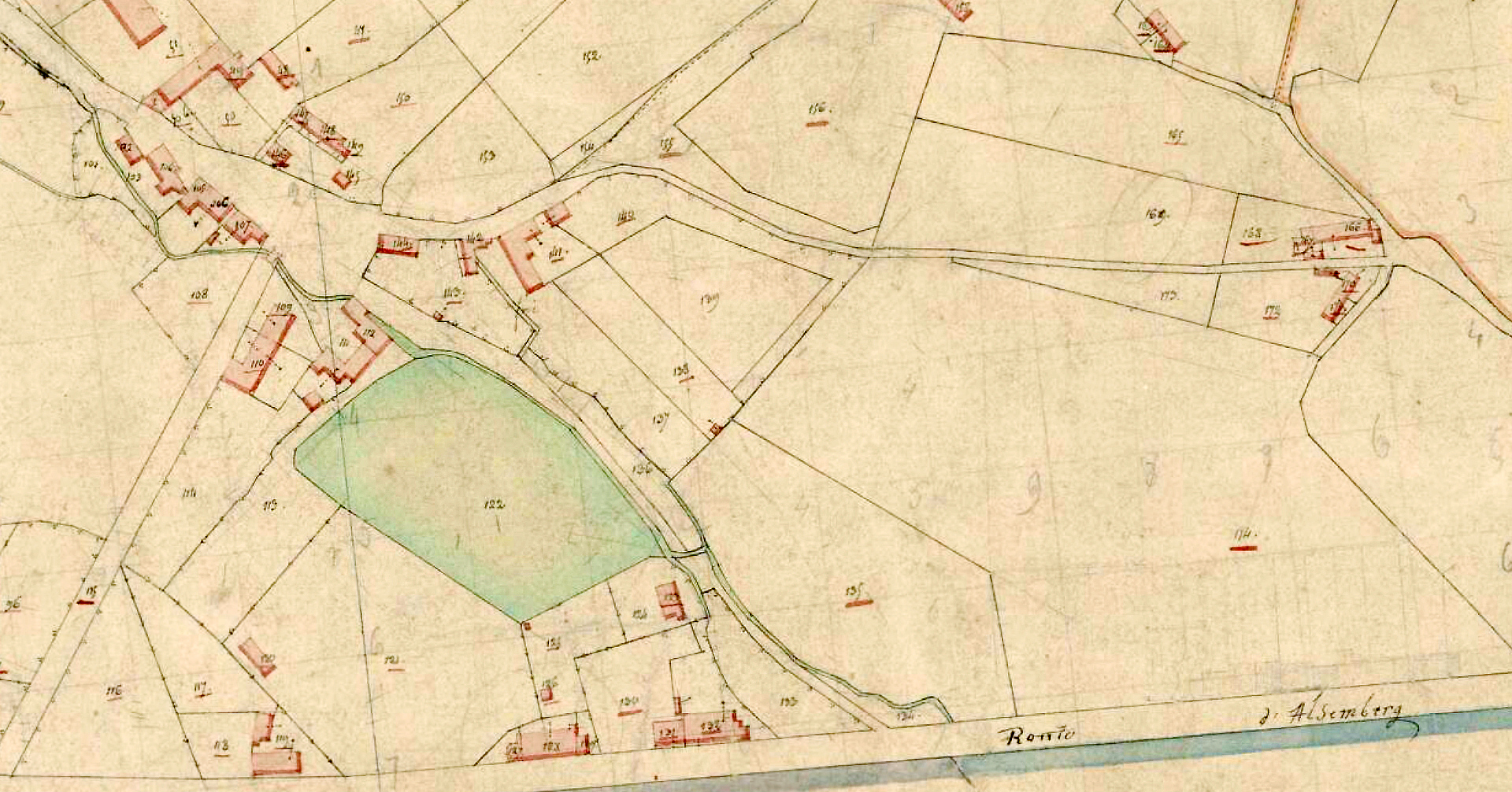
Uccle, c. 1830

At the end of the 18th century, a few years after the French Revolution, Uccle merged with neighbouring territories to become a municipality, with its own burgomaster (mayor) and municipal assembly. It had to wait until 1828, however, for the Dutch authorities to allow the construction of the first Municipal Hall. This was a time of economic prosperity and growth, stimulated by the proximity to the two main roads linking Brussels to the industrial south. A newer and larger Municipal Hall was built between 1872 and 1882. The banker and philanthropist Georges Brugmann was instrumental in the urbanisation of the municipality just before the turn of the 20th century. In the early 20th century, Michel van Gelder introduced a new breed of chicken, the d'Uccle, named after the town.

Despite the accelerated rate of construction that took place in the early 20th century, Uccle succeeded in keeping several of its green areas intact, which now attract many of Brussels' wealthier inhabitants. 19th- and 20th-century villas with gardens make this suburb a favourite with expatriates, with the Art Deco area around the Royal Observatory of Belgium and the fringes of the Sonian Forest two desirable addresses.

== Geography ==
Lying beyond Forest and Ixelles and skirting the Sonian Forest, Uccle is the southernmost municipality in the Brussels-Capital Region. With an area of 22.87 km^{2} (8.83 sq mi), it is also the second largest municipality in the region after the City of Brussels. Is is bordered by the City of Brussels, Forest, Ixelles, and Watermael-Boitsfort, as well as the Flemish municipalities of Drogenbos, Linkebeek and Sint-Genesius-Rode

== Main sights ==
Uccle is a mostly residential municipality, but has a lot of parks and forested areas, such as Wolvendael Park and the Verrewinkel Wood. Wolvendael is the site of a 1763 castle, owned by a number of notable aristocrats from the 18th and 19th centuries. The municipality is also situated to the immediate west of the Bois de la Cambre/Ter Kamerenbos. The Place de Saint-Job/Sint-Jobsplein and the area near St. Peter's Church and the Municipal Hall are two older parts of town, now filled with a mix of stores and pubs.

Uccle is the site of the Belgium national weather station, the Royal Meteorological Institute (IRM/KMI). Any information on Belgian weather, unless region-specific, is described by the statistics recorded there. Right next door is the Royal Observatory of Belgium.

Other points of interest include:

- Uccle Cemetery, also known as Dieweg Cemetery, created following a cholera epidemic in 1866. Although burials ended in 1958, the grave of Hergé, the creator of Tintin, who died in 1983, can be found there.
- The Villa Bloemenwerf, an Art Nouveau villa built in 1895 by the architect Henry Van de Velde as his first private residence.
- The Château de La Fougeraie, built in 1911 for the industrialist Paul Wittouck by the architects Louis Süe and Paul Huillard, and decorated by Gustave Louis Jaulmes.
- The Van Buuren Museum & Gardens, a former private house with extensive gardens, now a museum, built from 1924 to 1928 in Art Deco style for the banker and art collector David Van Buuren and his wife Alice.
- Nemo 33, the second deepest indoor swimming pool in the world.
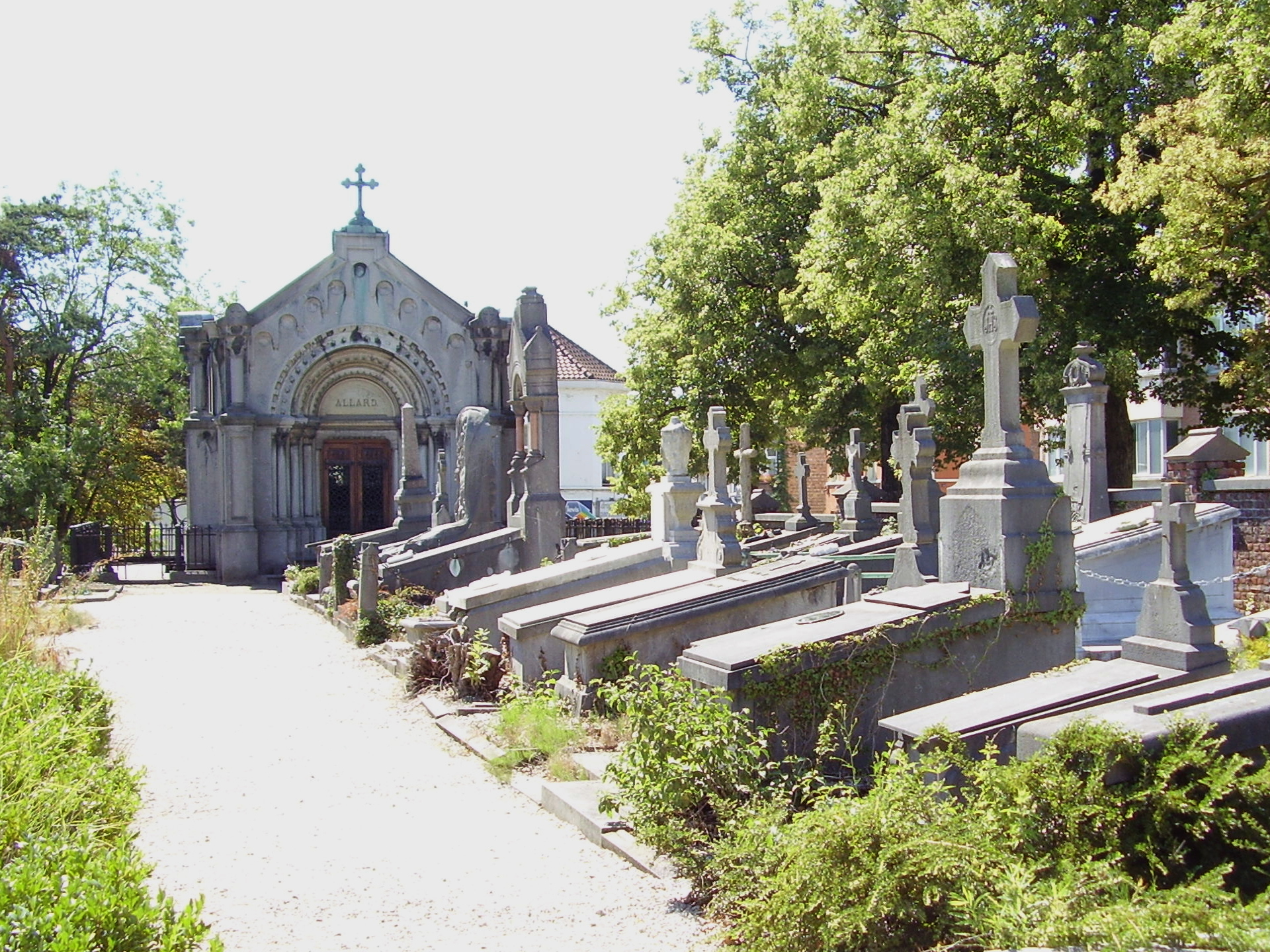
Uccle Cemetery

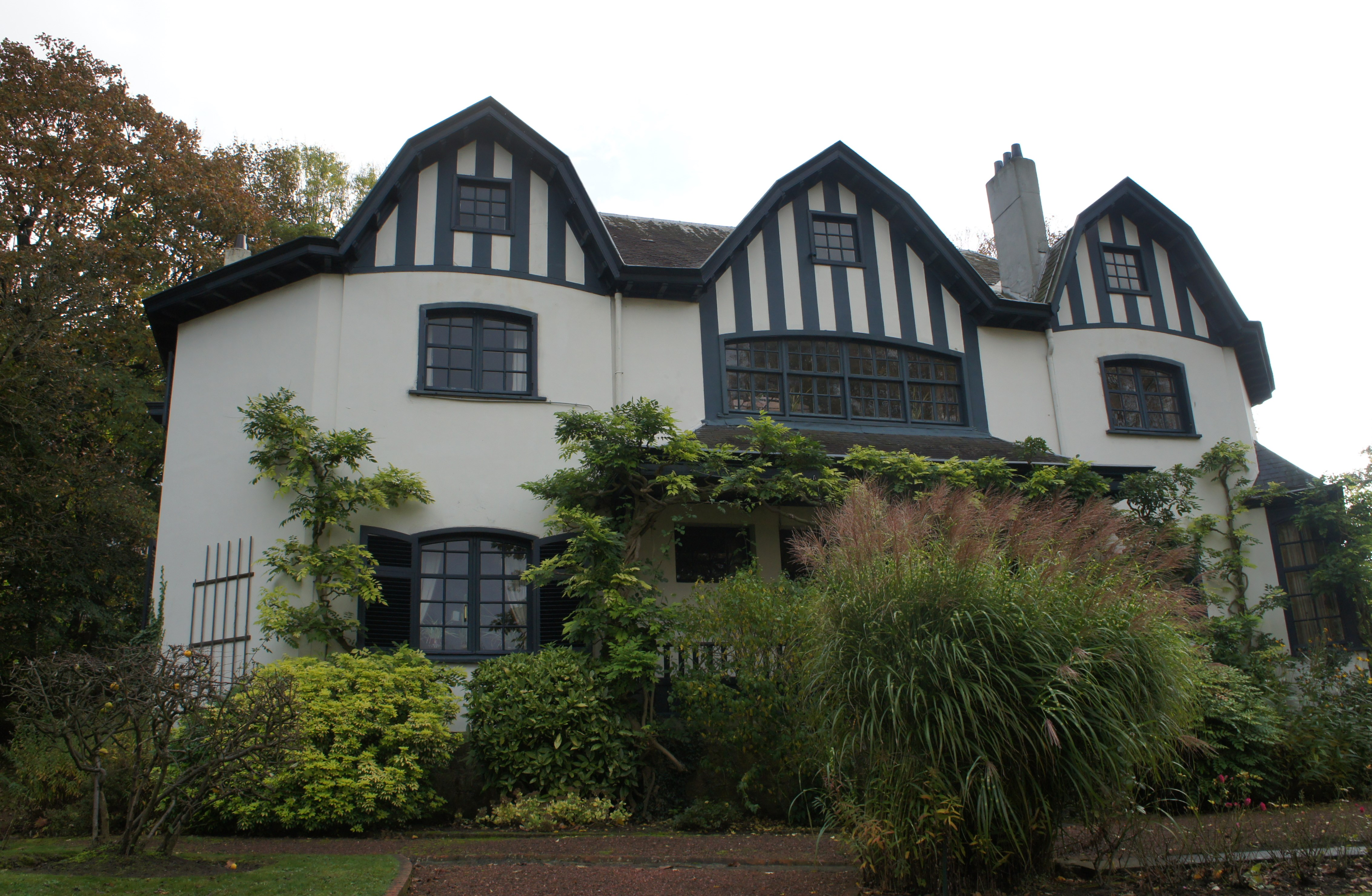
Villa Bloemenwerf

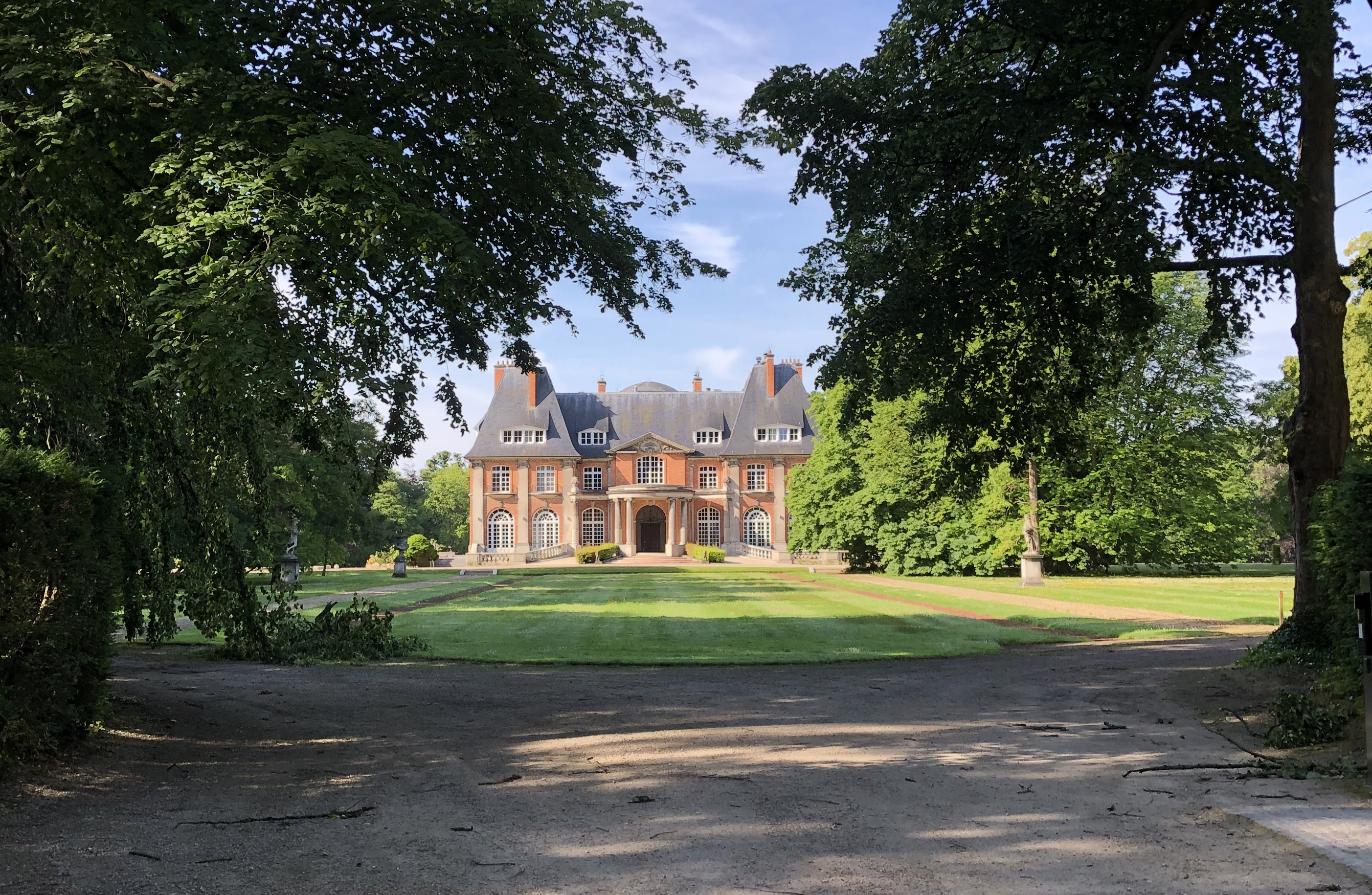
Château de La Fougeraie

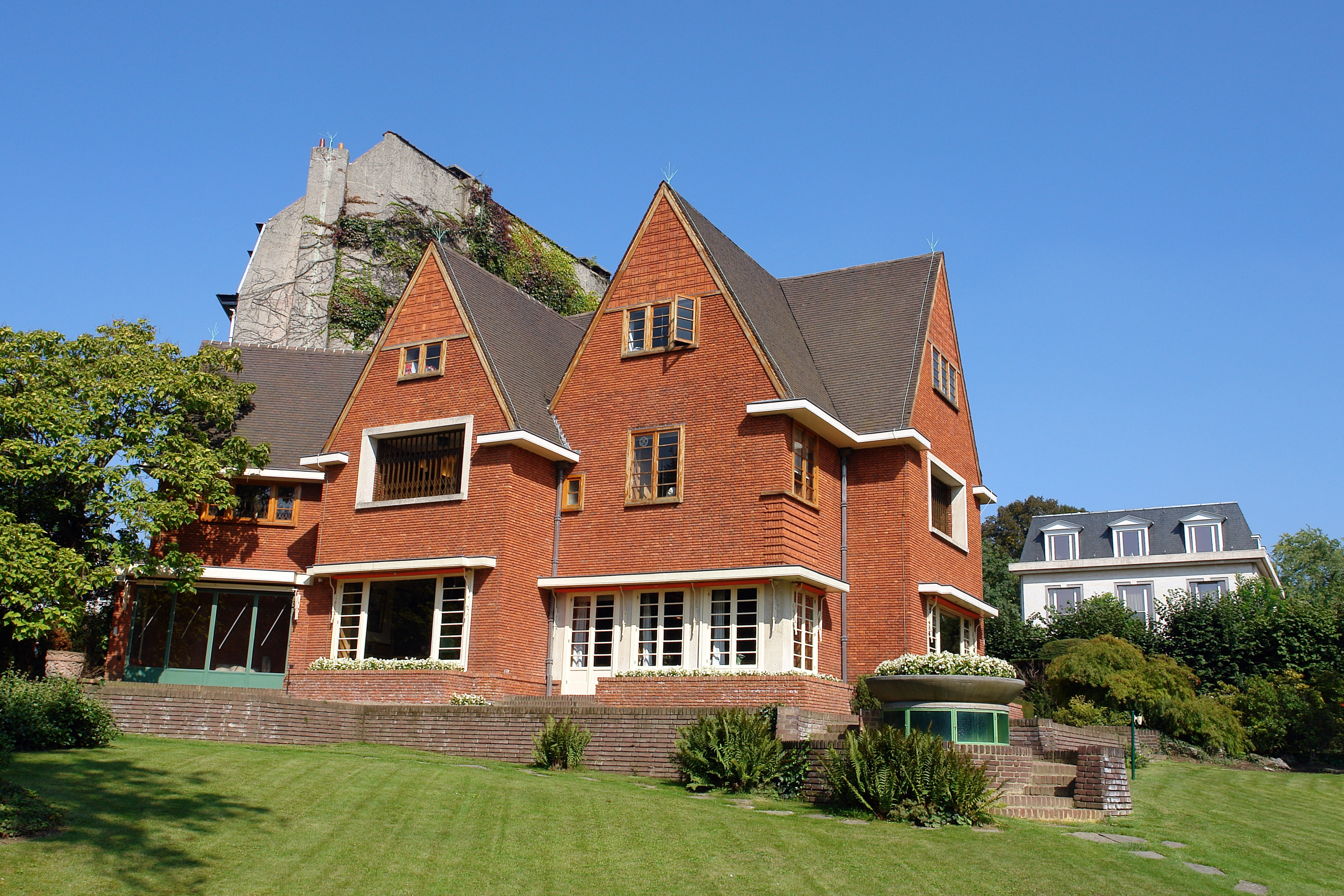
Van Buuren Museum & Gardens

== Education ==
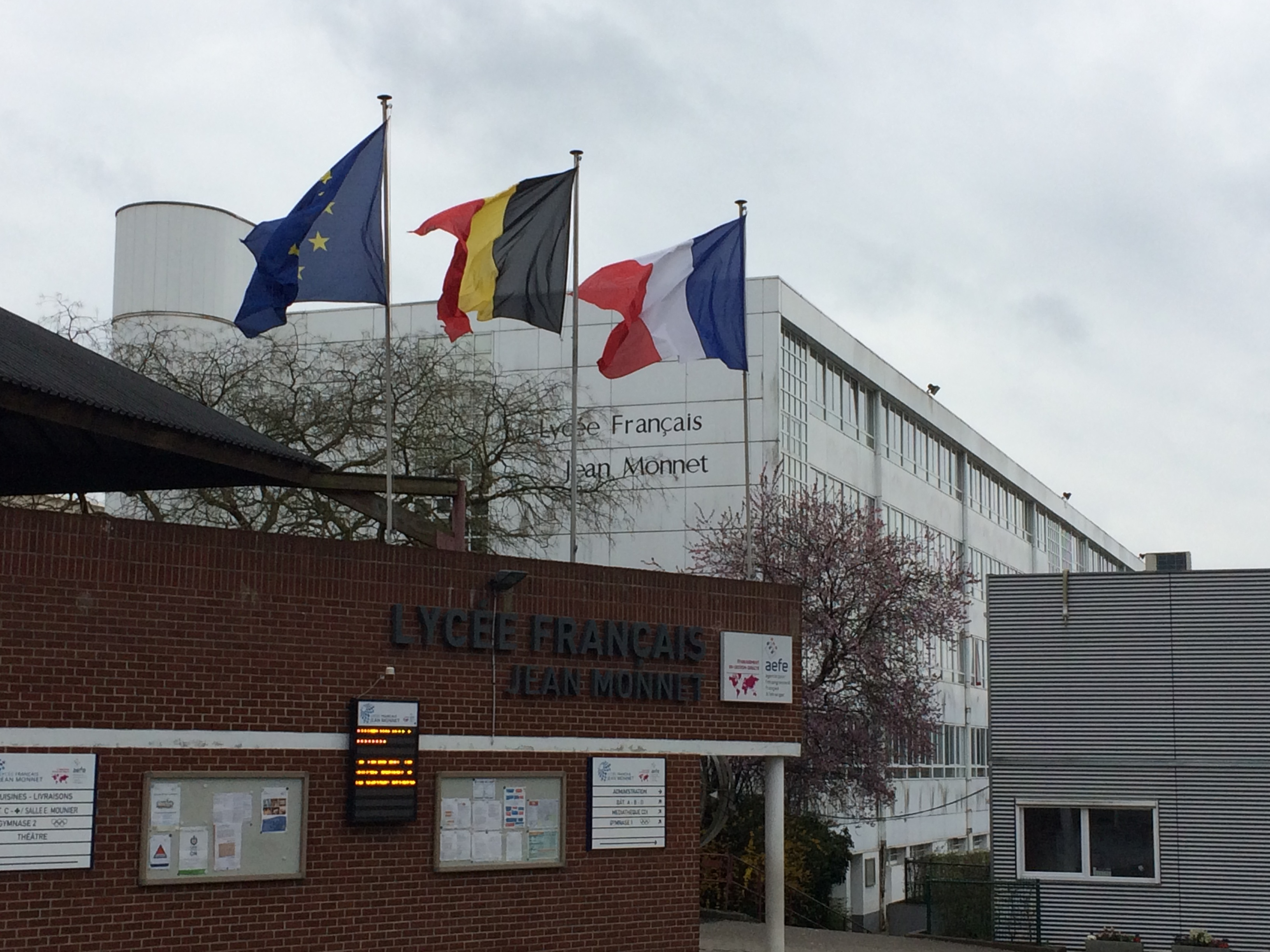
Lycée français Jean-Monnet

Most Uccle pupils between the ages of 3 and 18 go to schools organised by the French-speaking Community or the Flemish Community. Other schools include:

- European School, Brussels I
- Lycée Français Jean Monnet
- Collège Saint-Pierre, founded in 1905 by Cardinal Pierre-Lambert Goossens

== Notable inhabitants ==
- Armand Abel (1903–1973), academic and scholar of Islam
- Salvatore Adamo (born 1943), singer, lyricist, poet, and novelist
- Jean Améry (Hans Maier) (1912–1978), author and essayist
- Sandrine Blancke (born 1978), actress
- Cédric Blanpain (born 1970), academic and researcher
- Dedryck Boyata, football player
- Laetitia Darche (born 1991), model
- Roger De Coster (born 1944), professional motocross racer
- Maxime De Zeeuw (born 1987), basketball player for Hapoel Holon of the Israeli Basketball Premier League
- Jaco van Dormael (born 1957), film director
- Jef Dutilleux (1876–1960), impressionist painter
- M. C. Escher (1898–1972), Dutch graphic artist
- Lara Fabian (born 1970), singer-songwriter
- Jean-Michel Folon (1934–2005), artist, illustrator, painter, and sculptor
- Isabelle Gatti de Gamond, educationalist, feminist, and politician (1839–1905)
- Martin Gray (1922–2016), Warsaw Ghetto and Holocaust survivor, writer
- Pierre Harmel (1911–2009), lawyer, politician, diplomat, and Prime Minister
- Boris Johnson, Stanley Johnson, Jo Johnson, Rachel Johnson, Charlotte Johnson Wahl; British political and journalistic family, lived there in the 1970s.
- Vincent Kompany (born 1986), football defender and manager, former captain of the Belgium national team and current manager of Bayern Munich
- Joachim Lafosse (born 1975), film director
- Pierre de Maere (born 2001), singer-songwriter
- Princess Maria-Anunciata of Liechtenstein (born 1985)
- Princess Marie-Astrid of Liechtenstein (born 1987)
- Prince Wenzeslaus of Liechtenstein and Prince Rudolf of Liechtenstein (born 1974 and 1975, respectively)
- Queen Mathilde (born 1973)
- Marianne Merchez (born 1960), doctor and astronaut
- Axel Merckx (born 1972), professional road bicycle racer
- Philippe Moureaux (1939–2018), politician, senator, mayor of Molenbeek, and Professor of Economic History at the Université libre de Bruxelles (ULB)
- Erik Pevernagie (born 1939), painter and writer
- Louis Pevernagie (1904–1970), painter
- Henri Pirenne (1862–1935), historian
- Alizée Poulicek (born 1987), Miss Universe Belgium 2008
- Joseph Raphael (1869–1950), impressionist painter
- Axelle Red (Fabienne Demal) (born 1968), singer-songwriter
- Georges Remi, also known as Hergé (1907–1983), comic book author, creator of The Adventures of Tintin
- Sybille de Selys Longchamps (born 1941), baroness and aristocrat
- Willy Sommers (born 1952), crooner
- Olivier Strebelle (1927–2017), sculptor
- Jacques Tits (1930–2021), mathematician
- Henry van de Velde (1863–1957), painter, architect, and interior designer
- Angèle Van Laeken, better known as Angèle (born 1995), singer-songwriter
- Princess Stephanie of Windisch-Graetz (1909–2005), died there.

== International relations ==
=== Twin towns and sister cities ===
Uccle is twinned with:

- Neuilly-sur-Seine, France
- Ráckeve, Hungary
- Carthage, Tunisia
