= Dutilleux (surname) =

Dutilleux is a French surname. Notable people with the surname include:

- Constant Dutilleux (1807–1865), French painter, great-grandfather of Henri
- Henri Dutilleux (1916–2013), French composer, great-grandson of Constant
- Jean-Pierre Dutilleux (born 1949), Belgian author
- Jef Dutilleux (1876–1960), Belgian painter
