= RIC =

Ric or RIC may refer to:

== Codes and regulations ==
- Radio Identity Code, an address used in the POCSAG protocol for pagers
- Resin identification code, codes/symbols for recycling of plastics
- Reuters Instrument Code, a ticker-like code used by Refinitiv to identify financial instruments
- Regolamento Internazionale delle Carrozze (International Coach Regulations), requirements for passenger coaches in Europe

== Companies and organizations ==
- Rehabilitation Institute of Chicago, a rehabilitation hospital in Chicago
- Rickenbacker International Corporation, a guitar manufacturer
- Rhode Island College, Providence, Rhode Island
- RIC TV (Rede Independência de Comunicação), a Brazilian television network
- Rojava Information Center, a news agency headquartered in Qamishli in North and East Syria
- Royal Institute of Chemistry, a British scientific body
- Royal Institution of Cornwall
- Royal Irish Constabulary, the police force in Ireland from 1822 until 1922, when the country was part of the United Kingdom
- Richmond International Airport (IATA: RIC)
- Rickmansworth station, England, National Rail station code RIC

== Other uses ==
- RIC Forum (Russia, India, China). A group of countries that is grouped together in politics, who also have official summits.
- Roman Imperial Coinage, a 1949 chronological catalogue of coins from the time of the Roman Empire
- Ric, a British-German children's animated television series
- Ric, abbreviation of Recreative International Center; see Ric's Art Boat
- Ric, pen name of Canadian cartoonist Richard Taylor (1902–1970)
- Ric, an abbreviation of the name Richard
- RIC, symbol for the Ricci curvature tensor in mathematics
- Reading In Copy, in email context, a reference made to those recipients that were in the CC list of the email
- Regulated investment company
- Routine infant circumcision
- Radical Independence Campaign, a Scottish left-wing political campaign
- Rapid intervention crew, a firefighting procedure
- Receiver-in-canal, a type of hearing aid
- Recognised independent centre, a status awarded to institutes and centres by Oxford University
- Revised Index Catalogue, of astronomical objects
- Royal Irish Constabulary, Irish police force (1822–1922)
- Reduced intensity conditioning, in oncology
- Rehabilitation Impairment Categories (RICs), used to assign Case mix groups (CMGs)
- Webley RIC, a revolver adopted by the Royal Irish Constabulary in 1868
