= Louis Pevernagie =

Belgian painter (1904–1970)

Louis Pevernagie (1904–1970) was a Belgian expressionist and later abstract painter.

== Life ==
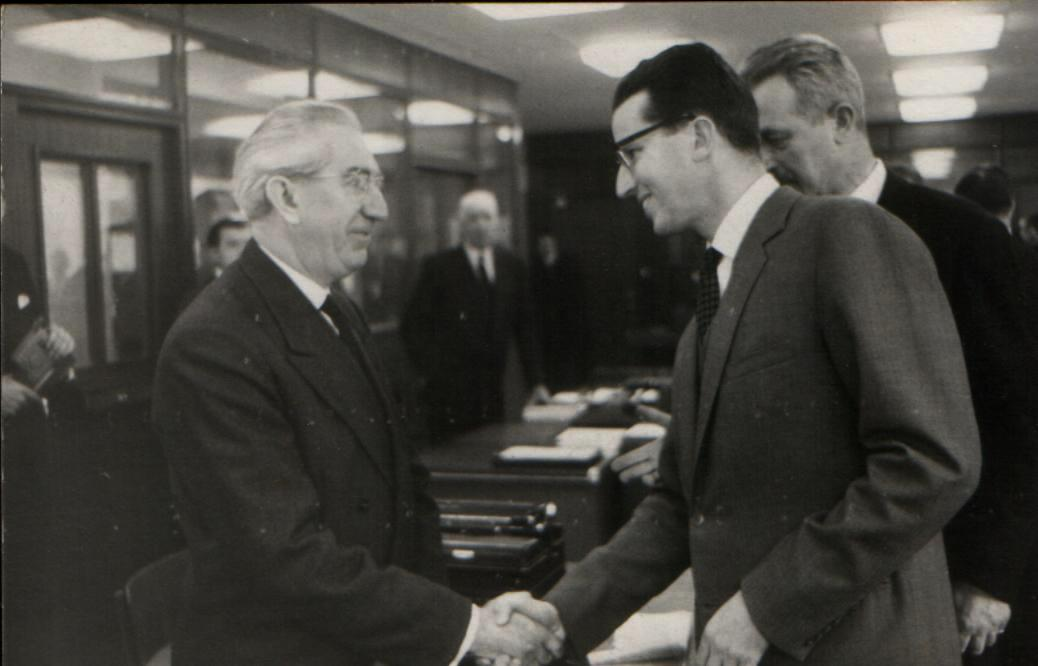
Louis Pevernagie (l.) with King Baudouin (r.)

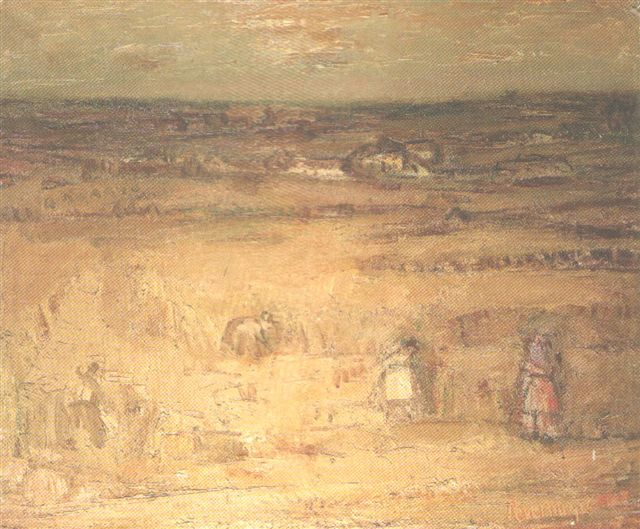
Harvest (100 x 120 cm), oil on canvas

Louis Pevernagie was born in Heldergem, Flanders in 1904. He was the father of the painter Erik Pevernagie. The landscapes of the Flemish Ardennes were the inspiration for many of his paintings and gave an idea of Flemish farm life. He obtained a degree of Teaching Education in 1924 but had started his career as a painter already during his studies. He married at the age of 30 and had 2 children. After World War II he moved to Uccle (near Brussels). His ideas and visions were expressed on canvas and on paper, but also in the media as he had become a journalist at Press Agency Belga. He died in Uccle in 1970.

== Work ==
Louis Pevernagie started as an expressionist painter. He mainly used warm colours with a powerful expression. As he was permanently in quest of light he could be classified among the "luminists". He tried to find a right balance between light and shade and conceived his paintings with intensity and self-confidence. His approach was rough and at the same time subtle. He carried out this interesting contradiction in a range of subjects like farmers at work, landscapes, interiors, nudes, flowers and still lives. After World War II he turned to non-figuration. Also in the abstract period he kept the power and the vigour of his artistic temperament

== Quotes ==
- He combines the achievements of expressionism and animism with a superb technical treatment of light and with an intimate approach to the subject. With Pevernagie light seems to have invaded his paintings: his images are almost consumed by an inner tension, a fire that subdues the pure material matter. (Norbert Hostyn, Museum of Fine Arts, Ostend)
- His period between 1920 and 1950 can be qualified as expressionist. After 1950 he turned to abstraction. He applies the technique of impasto. (Benezit Dictionary of Artists, Paris)
- Louis Pevernagie worked independently of all styles and directions and left us a wide-ranging production. He was an intuitive painter who experimented with many colors. In the course of his artist's life he evolved from expressionism to abstract art. (Knack)
- His play with color is reflected in his rural paintings and still lives, later in abstract compositions as well. He very often created chiaroscuro effects, mainly in a number of intimate interior scenes. (De Tijd)
- We can discern an interesting and passionate expressionist work with the quality that we recognize with the masters of Sint-Martens-Latem. This artist has revealed himself from 1925 as an excellent expressionist. From 1949 he was to be seduced by the abstract adventure. (A. Viray)
- The personality of Louis Pevernagie is marked by his intense passionate nature, the balance of passion and introspection, the precision of expression, the "monumental simplicity" of the outline, the strength of the colouring, the effect of light that subtly transposes things. His paintings are overwhelmed by deep forces. G. De Knibber
