= Château de La Fougeraie =

Stately home in Brussels, Belgium

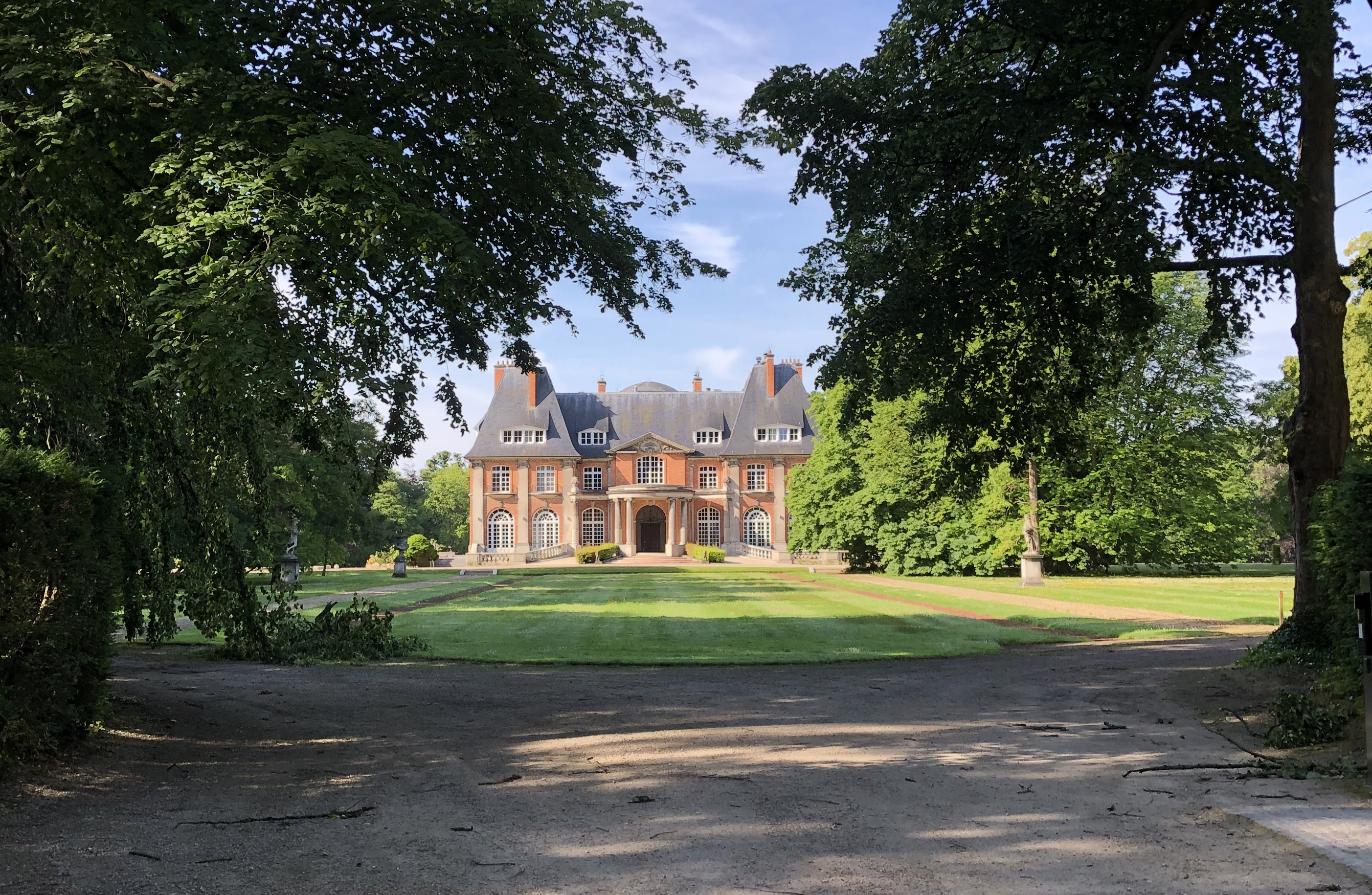
- The château in 2019

- Location within Belgium
- Alternative names: Château Wittouck

General information
- Type: Château
- Location: Uccle, Brussels, Belgium
- Coordinates: 50.790177°N 4.383744°E

Design and construction
- Architects: Louis Süe, Paul Huillard
- Engineer: L. Bogaerts

The Château de La Fougeraie, also called the Château Wittouck, is a stately home in Belgium built in 1911 for the industrialist Paul Wittouck. The château is located in Uccle, on the outskirts of Brussels, in the Sonian Forest.

== History ==
The château was built in 1911 for the industrialist Paul Wittouck by the architect Louis Süe. Paul Huillard collaborated with Süe on the project. The engineer was L. Bogaerts. Gustave Louis Jaulmes decorated the interior.

During World War II, the fascist leader Léon Degrelle occupied the château. In September–October 1944, Prince Bernhard of the Netherlands made it his base. The Dutchman Christiaan Lindemans, known as King Kong due to his physique, had served the British secret service for four years before offering his services to the Germans. He was arrested at the Chateau Wittouck on 28 October 1944 on suspicion that he had betrayed the attack on Arnhem. The charge was almost certainly false.

== See also ==
- List of castles and châteaux in Belgium
- Neoclassical architecture in Belgium
- History of Brussels
- Culture of Belgium
- Belgium in the long nineteenth century
