= Erik Pevernagie =

Belgian painter

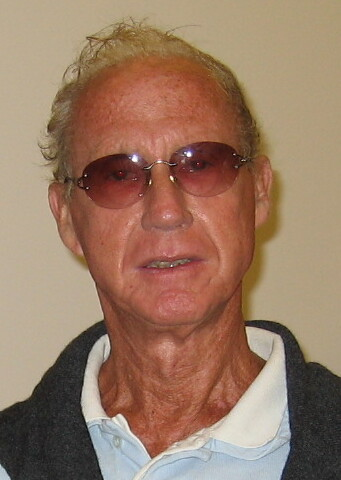
- Pevernagie in 2012
- Born: 1939 (age 86–87)
- Known for: Painting

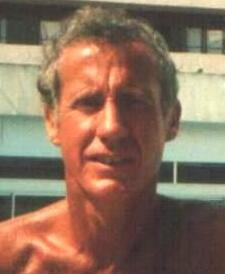
Pevernagie in 1987

Erik Pevernagie (born 1939) is a Belgian painter and writer, living in Uccle (Brussels), who has held exhibitions in Paris, New York City, Berlin, Düsseldorf, Amsterdam, London, Brussels and Antwerp.

== Life ==
Pevernagie is from Brussels, a bilingual city where Latin and Germanic cultures mix. He is the son and pupil of the expressionist painter Louis Pevernagie (1904–1970). From the start, he was interested in the Anglo-Saxon and Germanic cultural heritage and became a Master in Germanic Philology at the Free University of Brussels (1961). He earned a postgraduate degree at Cambridge University (UK) and became a professor at Erasmus University. A Master's degree in Leisure Agogics (1971) motivated him to create a social & cultural non-profit located on two boats in the Port of Brussels: "Ric's River Boat" and "Ric's Art Boat,", which allowed him to meet prominent figures in the art world. He became an associated academician of Accademia Internazionale del Verbano di Lettere, Arti, Scienze.

== Work ==
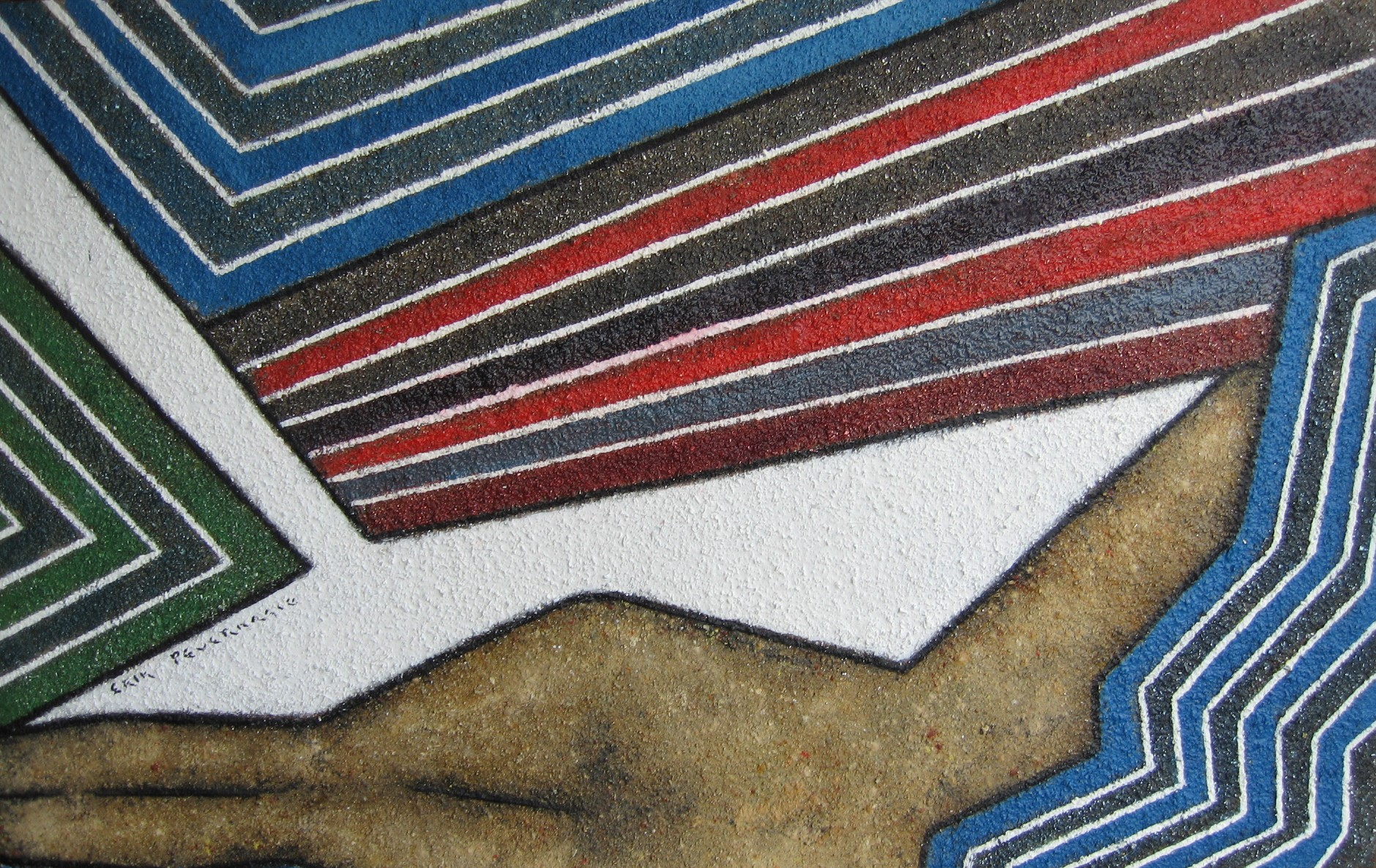
Erik Pevernagie. Terra incognita (90 x 120), oil & metal on canvas

Pevernagie's artwork frequently incorporates themes of social communication, alienation, and isolation. His paintings often combine figurative elements with abstract backgrounds, utilizing geometric lines and structured composition planes to integrate figures into their environments.

Technically, his work features distinct textures created by mixing materials such as sand, ashes, and metal filings into the oil paint on the canvas. He also integrates text, words, and graffiti-like sketches into his visual layouts, linking the literary titles of his pieces directly to the visual subject matter.

== Quotes ==
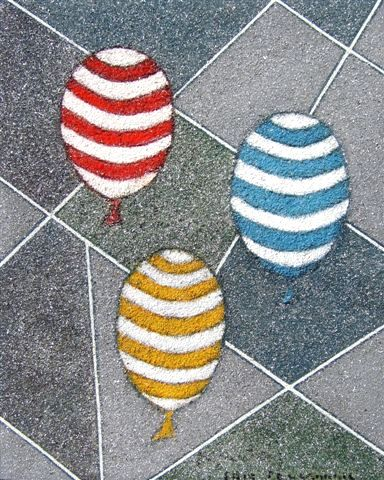
Les choses avaient enfin perdu leur pesanteur

- "Erik Pevernagie is primarily known for combining both figurative and abstract elements in his works. Starting with a simple geometric sketch or "graffiti," he builds the surface with materials such as ashes, sand, or metal chips." (Doyle New York)
- "'Man' stands in the heart of his work: man integrated into his natural environment, sometimes even absorbed by it. On the other hand, he seems to deny it, as Pevernagie introduces graffiti in his paintings. So doing, he gives evidence of the solitude of the human being, his alienation in the urban texture." (Bénézit Dictionary of Artists, Paris)
- "Bridging the gaps between generations, social strata, and nationalities is a tricky business. However, Erik Pevernagie may have hit upon a workable formula to ease the alienation. " (International Herald Tribune)
- "By denying any physical presence of the character and leaving simply dress evidence, the artist gives us a reproduction of the ground zero of the mind. His anti-hero has decided to make tabula rasa and get rid of all acquired alleged qualities." (Christie's, New York, Catalog)
- "His message, like a light beam across the fog of the human condition, calls our attention to the fragment to help us to explore the universe. The details serve as a starting point for possible knowledge, deepening our perceptions and consciences. Pevernagie offers the first pieces of a puzzle we must assemble. He freezes the moment as a password to disclose eternity. His philosophical approach to the "essence" is further materialized by a choice of technical parameters: the flatness of the perspective, the geometrical shapes, the narrow chromatic range, the use of material elements such as sand and metal files...somehow recalling Egyptian art, an art based on the language of icons and symbols, to explore and explain the mystery." (R.Puvia, London)
- "Belgian artist who adds geometrical color surfaces in his work to characters or architectural spaces. In addition, he uses material on his canvases such as sand and metal chips, which grant his pictures their special surface texture and which seem to submerge the separate entities into a refined, moderate colouredness through the reflection of the light." (Ketterer, Hamburg)
- "The human being who is present in all his work is reduced to a congruent portion. Some pale traits and bodies blend into the canvas, leaving space for accessories, highlighted by the artist in a more figurative manner. The material is omnipresent in Erik Pevernagie's paintings and gives his work all the intensity of the messages he tries to transmit. Metal, aluminum, sand. The ruggedness of his canvases is perfectly in tune with the long vanishing lines and the sharp angles of his paintings." (M. Ladaveze)
- "Typical exponent of the contemporary artist who combines abstract and figurative elements in his work. He starts with an idea and expresses that idea in a plastic way. Thus, he depicts a world that has become confused and insecure and asks questions that the spectator can interpret." (Paul Piron, Brussels)
- "Mixes figuration and abstraction with a poetic and philosophical key. Important are the framing, the intersections, and the balance of the surfaces. Introduces extraneous substances (ashes, sand, grit, etc.) which give an aspect of strangeness and ruggedness as if he leaves traces of the past." (Arto)
- "Always listening to the world around him, Erik Pevernagie grants to our fellow man a dominating place in his paintings. The individual is replaced by his environment, sometimes evoked by graffiti, and seems absorbed and dissolved by the elements surrounding him. The subtle touches of color, the half-abstract, half-figurative shapes, and the specific framing lead to the dissolution of the individual whose life seems to be but superficiality. Pevernagie invites us to go beyond the superficial barriers in order to discover the mystery behind his characters who are in perpetual tension as if they were waiting for something else, for another life." (Le Vif/L'Express)
- "Always starting from an event of the collective memory, Pevernagie paints a very insecure world in his very particular way. Half figurative, half abstract, he mixes elements of earth, sand, and metal cuttings on his canvas in sober beige, grey, and velvet red tones. He starts with simple graffiti, a sketch of a person, or a detail from daily life. These are used as a pretext for a network of pure and well-structured geometrical lines covering the whole surface of the canvas in order to bring about emotion. The titles are like twinklings in the eye.They are to be interpreted as one feels them. In the first degree or in the second degree. Astonishing in this work is the message that is brought to life. The artist asks questions. Pevernagie sees life in different ways, and painting is a way to express them. The paintbrush is a means of evasion and the color a gate to reflection." (Rey-Berthot)
- "The figures of Erik Pevernagie are absorbed, integrated into their environment by the color, the lines, and by the "idea", which is most important in his work. He starts with an idea, and then he paints it. With him, we find the problems which keep him busy, which haunt us, and which he depicts. He paints alienation, loneliness, unrest, uncertainty. Erik Pevernagie paints for a generation. Our world has been broken down, fallen to pieces, and become uncertain and ungraspable. But art and poetry are ultimate resources. Erik Pevernagie's work is thrilling. With him, we enter a totally different universe, beyond recognizable, readable reality. It's a universe we can interpret.In his art, he poses questions. He has a vision of man and the world. This artist is captivated by his subjects and by how he paints them. He changes how we see the world. " (Professor W. Toebosch)
- "For me, it's even more the shape that one perceives than the idea of the painter, which astonishes and alienates me. The painter obviously starts from a situation in everyday life. The shape and the structure impose themselves and create some disturbance. The canvas is almost empty. No cumbersome details. No technical tricks. I understand that it's the " details, "the small objects of life that surround us and form the framework through which we perceive the world, stimulating and encouraging thought. These objects often replace the interior world with many people." (L. Krasnova)

== Bibliography ==
=== Books and dictionaries ===
- Bénézit, Emmanuel (1999). Dictionnaire de Référence. Paris: Gründ.
- Jacobs, Petrus Maria Josephus Emiel (2000). Beeldend Benelux: Encyclopédie (Le-Po). Tilburg. p. 603.
- Piron, Paul (2003). Dictionnaire des artistes plasticiens belges. Brussels.
- Le Dictionnaire des artistes plasticiens en Belgique 1800-2002. Brussels: Arto. 2003.
- Delarge, Jean-Pierre (2012). Le Delarge: Le Dictionnaire des arts plastiques modernes et contemporains. Paris.
- The Dictionary of International Biography. Ely, Cambridgeshire, UK: Melrose Press Ltd. 2015.
- Guida Internazionale delle Belle Arti. MP Progetti. 2015. p. 109.

=== Academic publications ===
- Pevernagie, Erik (1962). "Ivy Compton-Burnett: "The children in her works"". Belgian Journal of Philology and History. 40 (2): 540–692.

=== Literary works by Pevernagie ===
- Pevernagie, Erik (12 March 2020). Words of Wisdom. ISBN 979-8611994962.
- Pevernagie, Erik (3 December 2020). Let Us Say More And Speak Less. ASIN B08PNX1NTR.
- Pevernagie, Erik (4 August 2021). Stilling our Mind. ASIN B09BYDNP5H.
- Pevernagie, Erik (26 October 2022). The Rabbit Hole of Meditation. ASIN B0BK5KGC35. ISBN 979-8355654337.
- Pevernagie, Erik (30 September 2023). The Infinite Wisdom of Meditation New. ASIN B0CK7TH2N3.
- Pevernagie, Erik. Painting and Meditation accord.
- Literary Quotes Pevernagie
- Erik Pevernagie: "Words of Wisdom" - 12 March 2020, ISBN 9798611994962
- About the philosophy of the Painting of Pevernagie
- "Let Us Say More And Speak Less" - Erik Pevernagie, Kindle Edition ASIN B08PNX1NTR Published 3 December 2020,
- "Stilling our Mind" - Erik Pevernagie, Independently published. ASIN B09BYDNP5H Published 4 August 2021,
- "The rabbit hole of Meditation" - Erik Pevernagie, Independently published -USA, 26 October 2022, ASIN B0BK5KGC35, ISBN 9798355654337
- "The Infinite Wisdom of Meditation NEW" - Erik Pevernagie, Independently published -USA, September 30, 2023 ASIN B0CK7TH2N3
- "Painting and Meditation according to Erik Pevernagie"- Erik Pevernagie, Independently published -USA, December 26, 2025 ASIN B0GCPYPVQH
