= Hierapolis (Phrygian Pentapolis) =

Town of the Phrygian Pentapolis in ancient Phrygia

Coordinates: 38°27′42″N 30°11′52″E

Hierapolis /ˌhaɪəˈræpəlɪs/ (Ancient Greek: Ιεράπολις Ierapolis) or Hieropolis (Ιερόπολις) was a town of the Phrygian Pentapolis in ancient Phrygia, inhabited during Roman and Byzantine times. Its bishop in the late 2nd century AD was Abercius, the subject of a famous inscription.

Its site is located near Koçhisar in Asiatic Turkey.
