= Paul Huillard =

- Born: 15 February 1875; Santiago, Chile
- Died: 11 February 1966 (aged 90); Paris, France
- Occupations: Architect, designer

Paul Huillard (French pronunciation: [ɥijaʁ]; 15 February 1875 – 11 February 1966) was a French designer and architect who collaborated on many projects with Louis Süe.

== Career ==
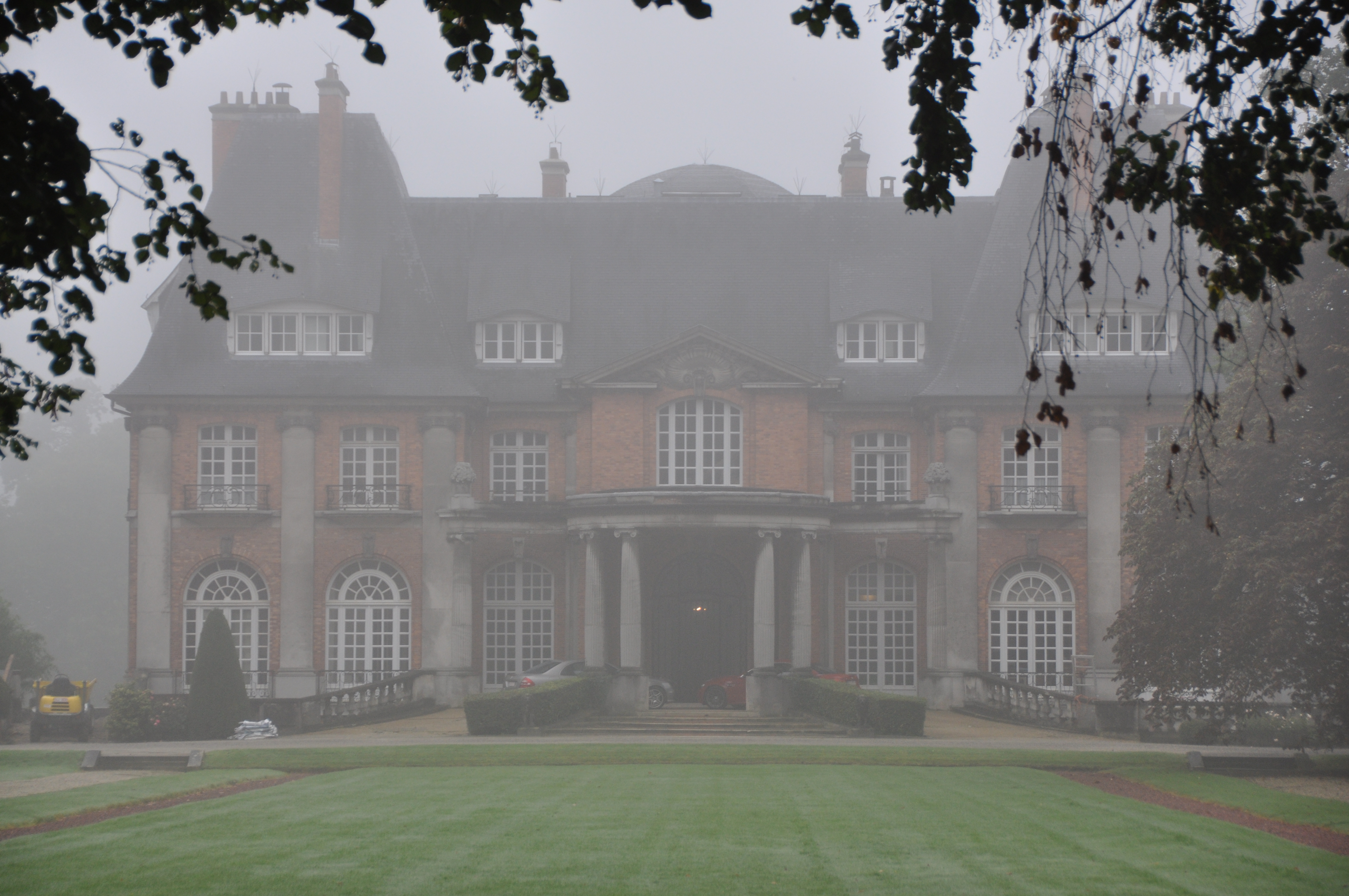
Château de La Fougeraie (1911)

Paul Huillard was born in Santiago on 15 February 1875. Huillard studied at the École des Beaux-Arts under Victor Laloux (1850–1937). He was a classmate of the architect Louis Süe. He qualified as an Architecte DPLG. (Note: Architecte DPLG: Architecte diplômé par le gouvernement. A professional qualification awarded by the École des Beaux-Arts and recognized by the government.) He married Jeanne Moreau on 17 April 1907.

From 1903 to 1912 Huillard and Süe worked as the Agence Süe et Huillard. They made a series of dwellings, particularly for their painter friends. Huillard and Süe collaborated on a row of buildings of the Rue Cassini, Paris. Other works included a group of artists workshops on Boulevard du Montparnasse (1908–12), the Hôtel de Couture of Paul Poiret (1909) and the Château de La Fougeraie (1911) in Brussels. The château was built for the industrialist Paul Wittouck (1851–1917). Sue, Huillard and the decorator Gustave Louis Jaulmes avoided Art Nouveau for the château, and instead chose the fashionable Louis XVI style "à la Grecque".

Huillard and Süe also designed furniture. They were involved in interior decoration, and regularly exhibited at the Salon d'Automne. Huillard exhibited an Art Deco bedroom at the 1913 Salon d'Automne. He also showed a model dining room at this Salon. In the French section of the 1925 International Exposition of Modern Industrial and Decorative Arts Paul Huillard designed the "library", a well-lit hall in which bindings, printed pages and engravings were displayed. In the 1930s Huillard created an educational game, Bâtir, with wooden blocks in various shapes and sizes painted with doors and windows. The blocks could be assembled in different combinations to make houses.

Paul Huillard became a specialist in the faience of the Yonne department. In 1960 he published a book on the faience of Auxerre from 1725 to 1870. Huillard assembled a large collection of faience objects, and installed his collection in the house where Georges Moreau was born, a pleasant bourgeois residence from the 19th century typical of the local architecture. He died on 11 February 1966 in Paris at the age of 90. He bequeathed the house and faience collection to the town of Villiers-Saint-Benoît, where it is now the Musée d'Art et d'Histoire de Puisaye.

== See also ==
- Art Deco in Paris

== Publications ==
- Paul Huillard (1960). La fai͏̈ence en Bourgogne auxerroise depuis 1725 environ, pendant la Révolution et jusqu'en 1870. Paris: Larousse. p. 229.

== Sources ==
- Auzias, Dominique; Labourdette, Jean-Paul (2005). Petit Futé de l'Yonne. Petit Futé. ISBN 2-7469-1326-7.
- Bohn, Willard (1997-01-01). Apollinaire and the International Avant-Garde. SUNY Press. ISBN 978-0-7914-3196-2.
- Campbell, Gordon (2006-11-09). The Grove Encyclopedia of Decorative Arts. Oxford University Press. ISBN 978-0-19-518948-3.
- Charles, Victoria; Carl, Klaus H. (2012-01-05). Art Deco. Parkstone International. ISBN 978-1-78042-804-8.
- Huillard, Nicolas (2015). "Arbre genealogique Huillard depuis 1685".
- Institut français d'architecture (1991-01-01). Archives d'architecture du XXe siècle. Mauad Editora Ltda. ISBN 978-2-87009-446-4.
- "La faience en Bourgogne Auxerroise depuis 1725 environ pendant la revolution en jusqu'en 1870 / Paul Huillard". National Library of Australia.
- Mardaga, Pierre (1991-01-01). Archives d'architecture du XXe siècle. Mauad Editora Ltda. ISBN 978-2-87009-446-4.
- "PAUL HUILLARD ARCHITEECTE DECORATEUR SALON AUTOMNE 1913 CHAMBRE A COUCHER (ART DECO)". delcampe.net.
- Sutcliffe, Anthony (1996). Paris: An Architectural History. Yale University Press. ISBN 978-0-300-06886-3.
- Swimberghe, Piet; Verlinde, Jan (1997). Living in Brussels. translated by Maxim Crowley. Lannoo Uitgeverij. ISBN 978-90-209-4979-7.
- "Villiers-Saint-Benoit, Musée d'Art et d'Histoire de Puisaye" (in French). L'Association du Personnel Scientifique des Musées de Bourgogne.
