= Armand Abel =

Belgian academic

- Born: 11 June 1903; Uccle, Belgium
- Died: 31 May 1973 (aged 69); Aywaille, Belgium
- Education: Free University of Brussels
- Occupation: Scholar

Armand Frédéric Charles Valère Abel (11 June 1903 – 31 May 1973) was a Belgian academic and Islamic scholar.

== Biography ==
Abel was born in Uccle, Brussels, on 11 June 1903. In 1924, he completed studies of classical philology at the Free University of Brussels. He then accompanied one of his masters to Egypt where he became interested in the Islamic world and Islam.

He initially taught at the Athénée de Schaerbeek high school from 1928 to 1953, although he also taught Arabic and Islamic studies for the Institute of Advanced Studies in Belgium. Having honed his knowledge of the language and the Muslim world in Paris (École Normale Superieure, Institut National des Langues et Civilisations Orientales, and École Pratique des Hautes Études), he also began teaching at the Free University of Brussels after a thesis of agrégation of higher education.

He created in Brussels but also for Ghent University, a comprehensive education program of Islamic studies and directed several research centers on contemporary Islam. He was also a member of numerous professional societies including the Accademia dei Lincei and participated for more than twenty years in all major international conferences on Islamic studies.

He died on 31 May 1973 in Aywaille, Belgium.

== Sources ==
- Annette l'Estrée, Abel, Armand, in Nouvelle Biographie Nationale (New National Biography), Volume 1, Royal Academy of Belgium, Brussels, 1988, p. 13-14 (ISSN 0776-3948)
