= Karl Maria Kaufmann =

German Biblical archaeologist

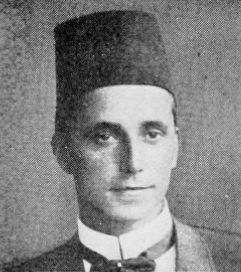
Karl Maria Kaufmann, before 1917

Karl Maria Kaufmann (March 2, 1872, in Frankfurt am Main – February 6, 1951, in Ranstadt) was a German biblical archaeologist who later embraced National Socialism. Kaufmann also published under the pseudonym Marchese di San Callisto. In addition to his scientific work, he emerged as a writer and author of historical novels.

== Life ==
Kaufmann was the son of a merchant of devotional articles who converted from Protestantism to Catholicism and co-founded the Frankfurt Centre Party. He boarded at Rockwell College near Cashel, County Tipperary, Ireland, from the age of eight to eleven. From an early age he was interested in archaeological excavations. After finishing school, Kaufmann initially studied Catholic theology and Classical archaeology in Berlin, later switching to Fribourg. During stays at the Campo Santo Teutonico in Rome between 1894 and 1902, Anton de Waal and Orazio Marucchi sparked his interest in biblical archaeology. There he also deepened his friendship with Anton Baumstark. During his studies, Kaufmann became a member of the KDStV Teutonia Fribourg of the Cartellverband in 1892 and later of the KAV Suevia Berlin. in Limburg 1899, he was ordained as priest for the Italian diocese of Gerace.

After completing his studies and various archaeological investigations in Rome, Kaufmann conducted several independent research trips from 1905 onwards. The rediscovery of the pilgrimage site (Abu Mena) of the early Christian martyr Menas of Egypt in the Libyan desert in 1905 became an initial highlight of his career. Kaufmann, who led the excavations there until 1908, undertook another research trip to Asia Minor, Syria, Egypt, and Sudan from 1911 to 1912. In the Fayum area, he managed to recover about a thousand ostraka in Greek, Demotic, Coptic, and Arabic. He reported on his research findings in various publications. In 1911 he was awarded an honorary doctorate by the University of Münster for his research. In 1919 the Prussian Ministry of Education granted him the title of professor. Married since 1922, he worked in Frankfurt as a private scholar and for some years (1932–1940) with a teaching assignment at the Johann Wolfgang Goethe University Frankfurt am Main. He failed to obtain a professorship and his financial situation remained permanently insecure.

Since Kaufmann's research trips were largely financed by the city of Frankfurt am Main, he first donated a collection of artifacts from the Menas excavation to the Frankfurt Liebieghaus in 1905, including about 1200 terracottas. During his second stay in Egypt, he acquired another 800 terracottas from middlemen and grave robbers in the Fayum, which he also made available to the Liebieghaus.

Kaufmann, who already held the honorary title of Monsignor within the Catholic Church, married "in advanced years" and had a daughter named Annegret among others in this vita nova.

=== Identity ===
The archaeologist Karl Maria Kaufmann should not be confused with the publicist Carl Maria Kaufmann, the editor of the integralist journals Kölner Korrespondenz, Apologetische Rundschau, and Der Fels, who was also a doctorate-holding Catholic priest (Dr. theol. and phil.), but was born on May 28, 1869, in Düsseldorf.

== Relationship with National Socialism ==
Kaufmann had been acquainted with the family of Rudolf Hess since 1905/07 and had been friends with Anton Baumstark for a long time. Under his influence, after the Nazis came to power, Kaufmann openly showed himself as a supporter of the Nazi state. According to Helmut Heiber's description, Kaufmann was an Orientalist and 'former priest' who was friends with the Hitler admirer "Abbot Schachleitner". In 1937, the Nazi Party assessed Kaufmann as a "true and enthusiastic National Socialist." He was one of the individuals involved in the Nazi project to "eliminate Jewish influence" in Frankfurt am Main in 1937.

In 1934, Kaufmann aimed to establish a Germanic ancestral heritage museum in Heddernheim, inspired by the local group leader of the Heddernheimer Nazi Party, with departments for Geology, Germanic Prehistory, Germanic Era, and Local History, and described the project in a memorandum. Ultimately, the project was rejected by the city's cultural office "on moral grounds": "... in Heddernheim stood the Roman stronghold of our homeland, directed against the Germanic people."

During the Nazi era, Kaufmann wrote various songs and hymns for the Hitler Youth and the Nazis, including the cantata "Prayer of Youth" ("Schon will ein goldner Morgen tagen") in 1933, which was set to music by Hermann Zilcher and premiered under Zilcher's direction during a radio concert in November 1935. The press announced the work as follows: "The poem of this small choral work is a tribute to the Führer and the Reich. Created in 1933, the poet K. M. Kaufmann leads the youth in awakening nature to fervent prayer..." This Nazi cantata, in which the youth were supposed to "dedicate our hearts, our souls under the swastika" to Hitler, was announced to end with a "jubilant Sieg Heil to the Führer."

No scientific books by Kaufmann from the Nazi era are known. However, Hubert Kaufhold recently demonstrated that the content of the (celebratory) publication "Karl Maria Kaufmann, Sketch of a German Scholar's Life" (Leipzig 1937), published under Anton Baumstark's name, was primarily authored by Kaufmann himself. He hoped to win over Adolf Hitler personally for the permanent financial provision for himself and his family with this publication, covered by his personal and political friend.

== Post World War II ==
After the end of World War II, Kaufmann lived in Ranstadt. There, he wrote his last work, "Allah is Great!", an autobiographical review in which he mainly focused on the time before World War I and his experiences with locals, guests, and traders during his research trips and excavation campaigns. This book was published by Herder Publishing House the year before his death. Looking back, he spoke of "forced followership" during the Nazi era: "Those who have been thoroughly tossed around by life usually remain prepared for changes of course of various kinds, even in the intellectual domain, not to mention elemental interventions or even the delusion of a struggle that we had to experience, bloody and cruel, destroying millions, uprooting millions, and under which now half of humanity suffers. Many a good German experienced his odyssey in forced followership, tossed far and wide, suffering much in the Homeric sense of the words."

Today, Kaufmann is considered, along with Adolf Furtwängler, as a "collector-archaeologist." Since 2008, a permanent exhibition on the upper floor of the Frankfurt Liebieghaus has been dedicated to both.

== Selected works ==
=== Scientific Publications ===
- Die Jenseitshoffnungen der Griechen und Römer nach den Sepulcralinschriften. Ein Beitrag zur monumentalen Eschatologie. Herder, Freiburg (Breisgau) 1897, (Digitalisat).
- Die Legende der Aberkiosstele im Lichte urchristlicher Eschatologie. Ein Versuch zur Lösung der Frage. In: Der Katholik. Folge 3, Bd. 15, 1897, Nr. 3, ISSN 0935-2244, S. 226–247
- Die Fortschritte der monumentalen Theologie auf dem Gebiete der christlich-archäologischen Forschung. Mit besonderer Berücksichtigung der Werke de Rossi's und des Spalatenser Congresses. In: Der Katholik. Folge 3, Bd. 16, 1897, Nr. 5, S. 385–409; Nr. 6, S. 501–514.
- Die sepulcralen Jenseitsdenkmäler der Antike und des Urchristentums. Beiträge zur Vita-Beata-Vorstellung der römischen Kaiserzeit mit besonderer Berücksichtigung der christlichen Jenseitshoffnungen (= Forschungen zur monumentalen Theologie und vergleichenden Religionswissenschaft. 1, ZDB-ID 528180-5). Kirchheim, Mainz 1900.
- M. di San Callisto (d. i.: Karl Maria Kaufmann): Die Wunder der Kirche der Katakomben und Märtyrer. Ein Trostbuch zur Belehrung und Erbauung des christlichen Volkes dargeboten. Roth, Stuttgart u. a. 1900.
- Sant Elia. Ein deutsches Heiligtum auf klassischem Boden. Erinnerungen an eine archäologische Streife in Etrurien (= Frankfurter zeitgemäße Broschüren. NF Bd. 20, Nr. 1, ZDB-ID 213785-9). Breer & Thiemann, Hamm (Westfalen) 1901.
- La Pègè du temple d'Hiérapolis. Contribution à la symbolique du christianisme primitif. In: Revue d’histoire ecclésiastique. Bd. 2, 1901, ZDB-ID 1244356-6, S. 529–548.
- Das Kaisergrab in den Vatikanischen Grotten. Erstmalige archaeologisch-historische Untersuchung der Gruft Otto's II. Allgemeine Verlagsgesellschaft, München 1902, (Digitalisat).
- Ein altchristliches Pompeji in der libyschen Wüste. Die Nekropolis der „großen Oase“. Archaeologische Skizze. Kirchheim, Mainz 1902.
- Handbuch der christlichen Archäologie (= Wissenschaftliche Handbibliothek. Reihe 3: Lehr- und Handbücher verschiedener Wissenschaften. Bd. 5, ZDB-ID 574387-4). Schöningh, Paderborn 1905, (Digitalisat).
- Die Ausgrabung der Menas-Heiligtümer in der Mareotiswüste. Bericht über die von C. M. Kaufmann und I. C. E. Falls veranstaltete Ausgrabung des Nationalheiligtums der altchristlichen Aegypter. 3 Bände. Finck & Baylaender, Kairo 1906–1908.
- La découverte des sanctuaires de Ménas dans le désert de Maréotis. Société de publications égyptiennes, Alexandria 1908, (Digitalisat).
- Manuale di archeologia cristiana. Pustet, Rom 1908.
- Der Menastempel und die Heiligtümer von Karm Abu Mina in der Mariûtwüste. Ein Führer durch die Ausgrabungen der Frankfurter Expedition. Baer, Frankfurt am Main 1909.
- Zur Ikonographie der Menas-Ampullen mit besonderer Berücksichtigung der Funde in der Menasstadt nebst einem einführenden Kapitel über die neuentdeckten nubischen und aethiopischen Menastexte (= Veröffentlichungen der Frankfurter Menasexpedition. 5, ZDB-ID 276260-2). Diemer, Finck & Baylaender, Kairo 1910.
- Die Menasstadt und das Nationalheiligtum der altchristlichen Aegypter in der westalexandrinischen Wüste. Ausgrabungen der Frankfurter Expedition am Karm Abu Mina 1905–1907. Band 1. Hiersemann, Leipzig 1910, (Digitalisat).
- Geleitwort in: J. C. Ewald Falls: Drei Jahre in der Libyschen Wüste. Reisen, Entdeckungen und Ausgrabungen der Frankfurter Menasexpedition (Kaufmannsche Expedition). Herder, Freiburg (Breisgau) u. a. 1911, (Gekürzte Ausgabe: Im Zauber der Wüste. Fahrten, Entdeckungen und Ausgrabungen der Kaufmannschen Expedition in der Libyschen Wüste (Menasexpedition) (= Aus aller Welt. 3, ZDB-ID 2135342-6). Herder, Freiburg (Breisgau) u. a. 1922).
- Ägyptische Terrakotten der griechisch-römischen und koptischen Epoche, vorzugsweise aus der Oase El Faijûm (Frankfurter Sammlung). Diemer, Finck & Baylaender Succ., Kairo 1913,(2., wesentlich vermehrte Auflage, als: Graeco-Ägyptische Koroplastik. Terrakotten der griechisch-römischen und koptischen Epoche aus der Faijûm-Oase und anderen Fundstätten. Finck, Leipzig u. a. 1915).
- Die heilige Stadt der Wüste. Unsere Entdeckungen, Grabungen und Funde in der altchristlichen Menasstadt weiteren Kreisen in Wort und Bild geschildert. Kösel & Pustet, Kempten u. a. o. J. (um 1914), (Digitalisat).
- Der Frankfurter Kaiserdom, seine Denkmäler und Geschichte. Ein Führer. Kösel, Kempten 1914.
- Handbuch der altchristlichen Epigraphik. Herder, Freiburg (Breisgau) u. a. 1917 (Abt Alban Schachleiter gewidmet).
- Gebete auf Stein nach Denkmälern der Urchristenheit. Ein Wegweiser zu ungehobenen Schätzen für Suchende aller gebildete Stände. Kösel & Pustet, Kempten 1921.
- Amerika und Urchristentum. Weltverkehrswege des Christentums nach den Reichen der Maya und Inka in vorkolumbischer Zeit. Delphin, München 1924.
- Ausgraber, Mumienjäger und tote Städte. Von der Romantik der Forschungen im Orient auf Grund eigener Erlebnisse. Scherl, Berlin 1928.

=== Novels ===
- 1897 Der letzte Flavier. Die Braut des Letzten Flaviers, Trilogy
- 1899 Das Dokument der Lady
- 1900 Der Ring mit dem Ichthys
- 1927 Die verlorene Stadt. Roman aus dem ägyptischen Ausgraberleben

=== Autobiography ===
- 1950 Allah ist groß! Erlebnisse und Begegnungen eines deutschen Forschers in einer entschwindenden Welt, Herder, Freiburg 1950.
