= Ric's Art Boat =

Coordinates: 50°51′46″N 4°21′01.2″E

Ric's Art Boat and Ric's River Boat are two boats moored in the Port of Brussels, highlighting artistic activities and events, supporting initiatives for social integration and cultural entertainment projects.

== History ==
RIC (Recreative International Center) was created by the artist Erik Pevernagie, his students and colleagues in 1973.

Being influenced by the spirit of the late sixties: University of Paris X: Nanterre, Daniel Cohn-Bendit, Berkeley University of California, Herbert Marcuse, Free University of Berlin, Rudi Dutschke, they supported the Free Speech Movement, and had contacts with both French student circles in May 1968 and German reformers (German student movement). Advocating that at least one-third of people's existence should be available for creative leisure, Pevernagie insisted on the recreational side of life: time budget saved after work and sleep.

"Imagination being back in power," old values were scrutinized. Two floating social and cultural entertainment centers were created to meet recreational demands: Ric's Art Boat and Ric's River Boat.

These boats have since been a meeting place for international artists and film directors (ex. Atom Egoyan, Claude Lelouch, Benoit Lamy, Jan Verheyen (director), visual artists (ex. Luc Tuymans, Nicolas Vial, illustrator of French Newspaper Le Monde), singers (ex.Axelle Red, The Kooks, Tom Barman, Karen Cheryl), authors (Hugo Claus).

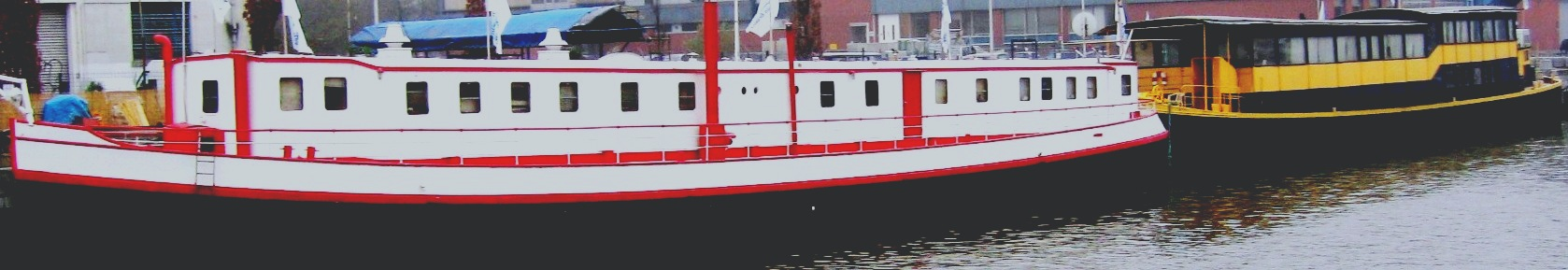
Ric's Art Boat and Ric's River Boat

== Backstory of the boats ==
Ric's River Boat is a vessel built by Boele & Zn. Slikkerveer in 1900 as a steam tug Express for Rhine Screw Tug Express NV (A. van Dort ) in Rotterdam. It has a length of 42 meters, a width of 7.50 meters, and a tonnage of 387 tons. In 1916, the ship was sold to the Dutch Transport Maatschappij NV in Rotterdam and was called Mimir. After the war, the Royal Netherlands Navy in Amsterdam took over authority from the ground troops in 1946. It became the host ship Leeuw ( HW 11) for the housing of the Marines. It was renumbered in 1955 to (A 889). In 1948/1949, it accommodated Marva ( Female Marines). From 1961 to 1975, it was used as an institution for Social Youth Care in Dordrecht named "Hollands Glorie." It replaced the ship of the same name, the old light vessel Haaksgronden, which had been used since December 3, 1941. In 1978, it was handed over to the non-profit organization, RIC (Recreative International Center), under the name Ric’s River Boat ( BR 40548 B ) and moored in the center of Brussels.

Ric's Art Boat ( BR 40547 B) is a barge built in Dendermonde (Belgium) in 1936 and was baptized Selenium. It has a length of 38 meters and a tonnage of 370 tons

== Artistic Commitment ==
Being persuaded that art, by its creative power, can unleash positive energy and create closer relations between individuals and people, cultural aspects have been highlighted by the organizers. Says Le Soir [1]: “Art is displayed at Ric's Art Boat. An open gallery on the water and the banks of Brussels. Two boats moored at the Quai des Péniches in recent years have been multiplying cultural events and festivities.”

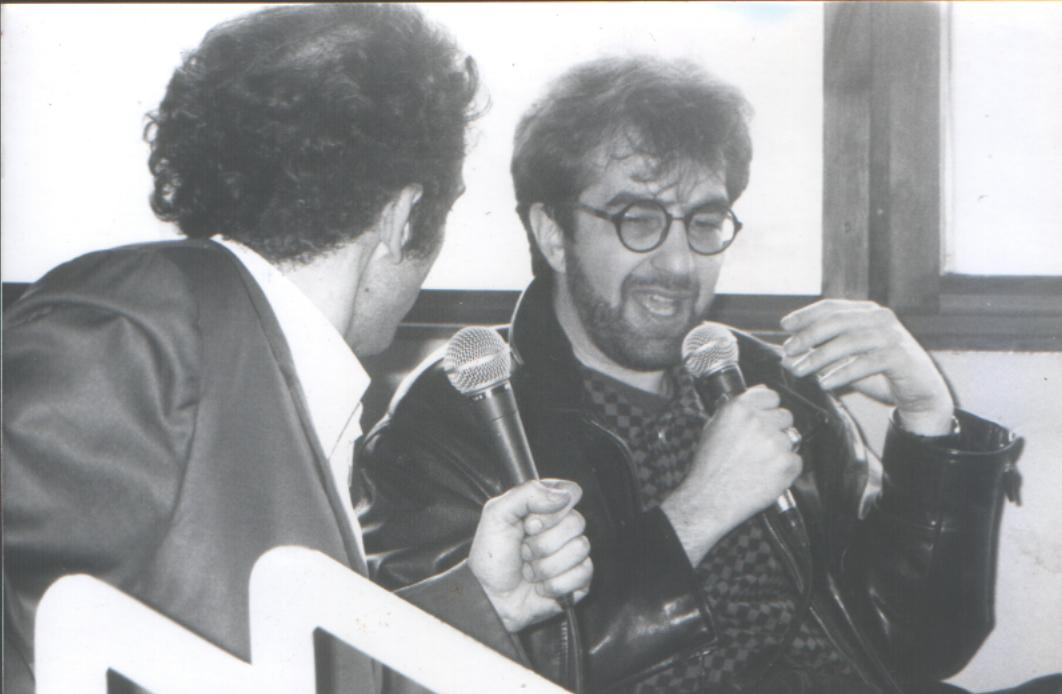
Film director Atom Egoyan was awarded the Grand Prix de l'Union de la critique de cinéma for Exotica (film) and held a conference and debate at Ric's Art Boat & River Boat in 1994

== Social engagement ==
Realizing that lack of knowledge can lead to suspicion, cause feelings of isolation, and generate an environment of estrangement, unfriendliness, or even hostility, they felt the need to express their social concern. Says La Dernière Heure [2]: "The Chairman of Ric's Boats noticed that foreigners settle in Belgium and watch the "natives" "like fish in an aquarium." They are very often surprised by the perplexing behavior of these "local tribes." On the other hand, the flow of aliens is accepted by some natives with reluctance. They are surprised by these new faces that "decorate" or "pollute" their environment and do not like the manners of these intruders. 'So I noticed this double repulsion and thought we had to do something about it. Human contact is lacking: straight, informal contact without prejudice."

== Environmental concern ==
Having been constantly disfigured by ruthless building promoters and careless politicians, Brussels had become the victim of irresponsible urban development, the so-called " Brusselization. " Ric's organizers thought it was important to find an appropriate mix between the waterline, the glass and concrete townscape, and the human presence. Says La Capitale [3]: " One can rediscover a neighborhood, which has been unfairly disregarded in the past: the canal area. At the same time, one can rediscover an uncommon spot: "Ric's Art Boat."

== Recreation and Entertainment ==
Ric's Art Boat regards recreation and artistic, social, and environmental activities as vital to its existence. They feel that leisure should be carefully managed as a means of regeneration and restoration.

== Quotes ==
- "Learning to think internationally, thanks to RIC. Hospitable center in the capital." (De Standaard) [5]
- "Now in its 27th year as a concert hall, the boat is a popular venue with the Brussels in-crowd, who use it for everything from poetry readings and classical concerts to house parties." (The Bulletin, April 18, 2002) [6]

== Bibliography ==
- Dictionnaire d'Histoire de Bruxelles, Proposon, Bruxelles, 2013, p. 664
- Le Guide des connaisseurs, janvier 1991, n° 144, p. 3
- Reisgids : Neem nou Brussel, Hans De Bruijn en Gerrit Six, Arbeiderspers/A.W. Bruna, Utrecht,1986
- Being Urban, ISELP - CFC Editions, Pauline de La Boulaye & Adrien Grimmereau, p. 49

== Notes ==
1. Le Soir 31 October 1996
2. La Dernière Heure 15 March 1974
3. La Capitale 2003
4. De Standaard May 6, 1974
5. The Bulletin April 18, 2002
