= Jef Dutilleux =

Belgian painter

Pierre-Joseph Dutilleux
- Born: 1876; Saint-Gilles, Belgium
- Died: 1960 (aged 83–84); Uccle, Belgium
- Known for: Painter
- Movement: Impressionism, Post-Impressionism

Jef Dutilleux (1876-1960) was a Belgian painter, mainly active in the first half of the 20th century.

During the German occupation of Belgium in the First World War, Dutilleux sought refugee in the Westhoek. After the war, he documented the destruction before returning to his home in Uccle. Two of his works from this period, Ecluse de Chasse - crique de Nieuwendamme and Yser, are part of the collections of the Royal Museums of Fine Arts of Belgium. Yser, commissioned in 1919, was acquired by the museums in 1920.

He lived at 24, rue de la Pêcherie in Uccle-Saint-Job, Belgium, where he died in 1960.

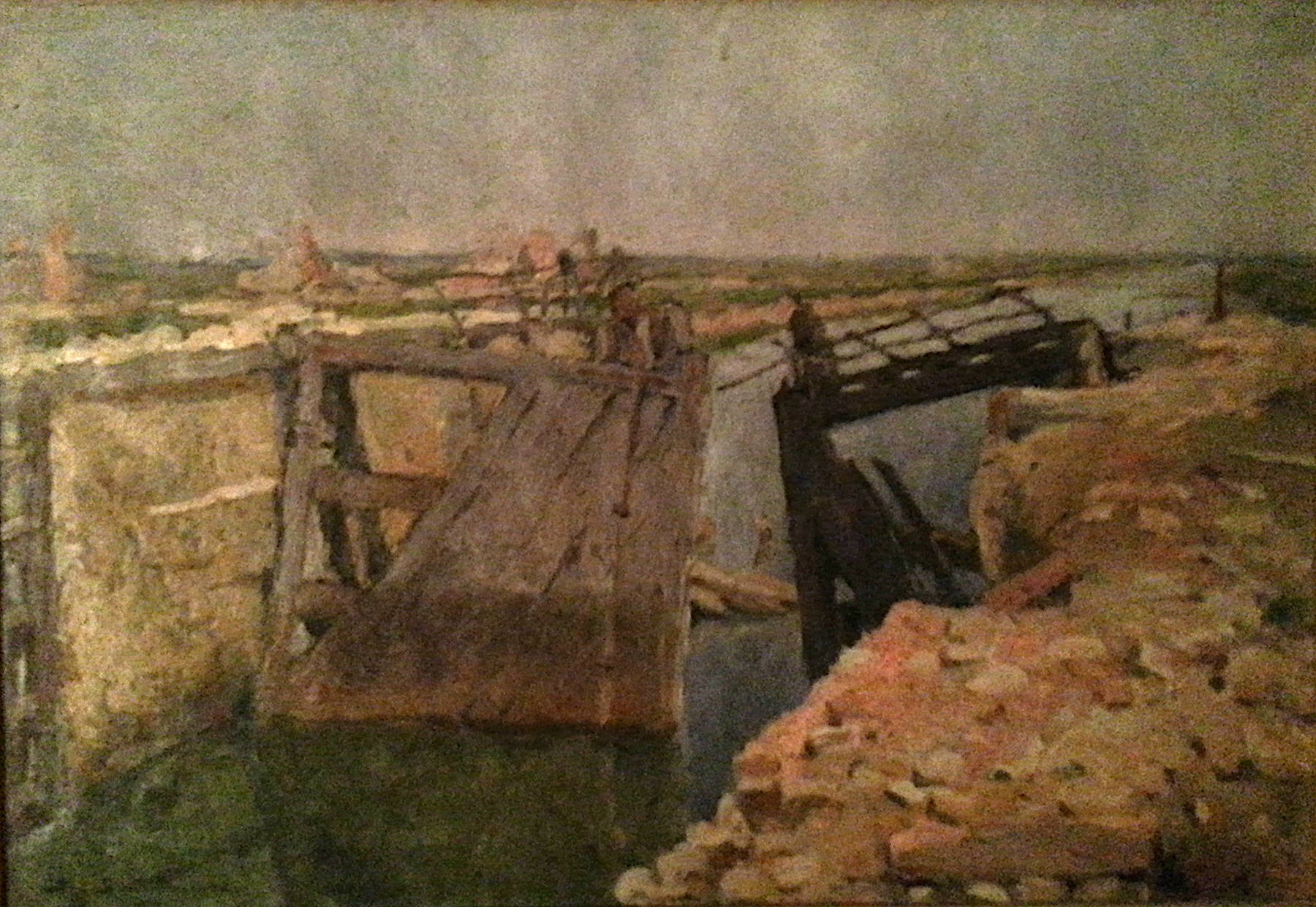
1919 painting by Jef Dutilleux of a dyke destroyed by the retreating Belgians.
