= Abercius of Hieropolis =

2nd-century Bishop of Hieropolis and saint

Saint Abercius
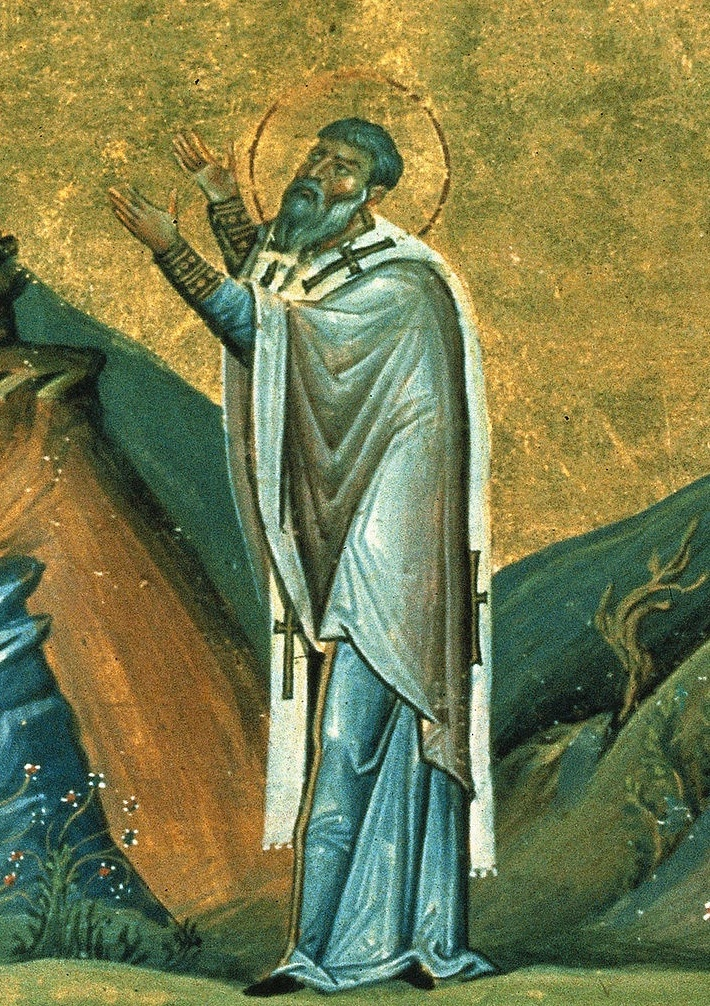
- Miniature from the Menologion of Basil II

Equal-to-the-Apostles
- Venerated in: Catholic Church; Eastern Orthodox Church
- Feast: 22 October/4 November
- Attributes: crosier brought to him by an angel

Abercius of Hieropolis (Ancient Greek: Ἀβέρκιος; died c. 167), also known as Saint Abercius, was a Christian clergyman of Hierapolis in Phrygia Salutaris during the reign of the Roman emperor Marcus Aurelius, and is generally, though not indisputably, regarded as having been bishop of Hierapolis and the successor of Papias. He may also be identical with an author referred to in later sources as Avircius Marcellus.

Abercius is principally known from an important inscription that he apparently had erected over his future tomb. The inscription records a journey to Rome, where he states, "I saw a people bearing the splendid seal", the "seal" referring to baptism, and a journey beyond the Euphrates, where, in his words, "everywhere I had associates". It also attests to the contemporary practice of the Eucharist with bread and wine.

== Biography ==
Abercius is said to have evangelized across Syria and Mesopotamia, and it is on that basis that he is referred to as one of the Equals-to-the-Apostles. He was imprisoned under Marcus Aurelius (r. 161–180), and died about 167.

Abercius' feast day is celebrated on 22 October (for those churches which follow the Julian Calendar, 22 October occurs on the Gregorian Calendar date of 4 November).

== Works ==
Several works are ascribed to Abercius:

1. An Epistle to the Emperor Marcus Aurelius, of which Baronius speaks as extant, but he does not produce it
2. A Book of Discipline (Greek Βίβλος διδασκαλίας) addressed to his clergy; this too is lost.

Abercius is also the subject, and probable author, of the Inscription of Abercius, preserved in the Vatican Museums.

== Controversy over location of Abercius' bishopric ==
William Ramsay has said that "Abercius was bishop of Hieropolis in the valley of Sandukli and not of Hierapolis in the Maeander valley, for the latter was in Phrygia Magna, or Pacatiana." He states that "The confusion of the two towns Hierapolis and Hieropolis has produced much error in early Christian history. ... Hierapolis of Salutaris must always be interpreted as the Hieropolis in the valley of Sandukli: Hierapolis near Laodicea is always assigned in the Byzantine authorities to Pacatiana".

J. B. Lightfoot said that "the city of Abercius was not Hierapolis on the Mæander but this Hieropolis near Synnada." The Catholic Encyclopedia notes that Ramsay "discovered at Kelendres, near Synnada, in Phrygia Salutaris (Asia Minor), a Christian stele (inscribed slab) bearing the date of the year 300 of the Phrygian era (216 AD). The inscription in question recalled the memory of a certain Alexander, son of Anthony. De Rossi and Duchesne at once recognized in it phrases similar to those in the epitaph of Abercius. On comparison it was found that the inscription in memory of Alexander corresponded, almost word for word, with the first and last verses of the epitaph of the Bishop of Hieropolis; all the middle part was missing. Mr. Ramsay, on a second visit to the site of Hieropolis, in 1883, discovered two new fragments covered with inscriptions, built into the masonry of the public baths. These fragments, which are now in the Vatican Christian Museum, filled out the middle part of the stele inscribed with the epitaph of Abercius. It now became possible, with the help of the text preserved in the Life, to restore the original text of the epitaph with practical certainty."

== See also ==
- Inscription of Abercius

Catholic Church Titles
Preceded by Papias of Hierapolis	Bishop of Hierapolis; 155-167	Succeeded by Apollinaris Claudius
