= André and Paul Vera =

André and Paul Vera were French brothers who were pioneers of the Art Deco style.

André Vera (1881–1971) was a theoretician on garden design and a town planner. Paul Vera (1882–1957) was a painter and decorator. The Vera brothers collaborated on formal, geometric garden designs in Art Deco style. The brothers joined with other artists to create L'Atelier Français, a cooperative business that borrowed organizational idea from the Wiener Werkstätte. The other members included Louis Süe, Roger de La Fresnaye, André Groult, Gustave Louis Jaulmes (1873–1959) and André Mare (1885–1932).

== Sources ==
- A Everitt (2013-03-16). "The Art Deco Garden".
- Goss, Jared (2014-09-30). French Art Deco. Metropolitan Museum of Art. ISBN 978-0-300-20430-8.
- "Musée municipal et collections". Mairie de Saint Germain en Laye. Archived from the original on 2015-06-21.
