= André Vera =

French garden designer and town planner

- Born: 1881; Paris, France
- Died: 1971 (aged 89–90)
- Occupations: Garden designer and town planner
- Known for: Le Nouveau Style (1912)

André Vera (1881–1971) was a French garden designer, town planner and pioneer of the Art Deco style. He is known for his collaboration with his brother, the painter and decorator Paul Vera. He wanted to renew French design, which he felt had been in decline since the 1840s, and to introduce a modern French style that maintained continuity with earlier French tradition. He was an advocate of the formal French garden, with strictly geometrical designs based on lines and squares in place of the curvilinear forms of Art Nouveau. In urban design he stressed the importance of including trees as architectural elements, which he thought would enhance the mental and physical health of the residents.

== Life ==
André Vera was born in Paris in 1881. His father was Gustave Lėon Vera, an architect, and his younger brother Paul became a painter and decorator designer. André Vera became a garden design theoretician and a town planner.

== Art Deco ==
The Vera brothers were early adopters of the Art Deco style. This originated with the work of Louis Süe, and was described by André Vera in his manifesto Le Nouveau Style published in L'Art décoratif in January 1912. He called for classicism, symmetricality and mathematical order in designs, with stylized naturalistic decorative motifs. Vera asserted that decoration should use contrasting rich colors in place of the pale tones of Art Nouveau. Vera rejected internationalism and pastiche and called for respect for French traditions, in particular for the rationalism of the Louis XVI period and the more comfortable Louis-Philippe style. In Vera's view, French design had ceased to innovate in the 1840s, but had resorted to pastiche, the start of a long decline. He wrote in 1912, "It is therefore from the Louis-Philippe style that we can draw the best lesson, especially when one considers that the point is not to repeat it but rather to continue it."

The Vera brothers joined with other artists to create L'Atalier Français, a cooperative business that borrowed organizational idea from the Wiener Werkstätte. The other members included Louis Süe, Roger de La Fresnaye, André Groult, Gustave Louis Jaulmes (1873–1959) and André Mare (1885–1932). André Vera wrote a manifesto that defined the goal of the group as combining traditional and modern ideas to bring clarity, order and aesthetic unity to interior design. Vera joined the Compagnie des Arts Français, which succeeded the Atalier Français after World War I (1914–18). He wrote that it, "would have no truck with either the English or the Dutch, but [continued] the French tradition, working in such a way that this new style will be the heir to the last traditional style that we have had, that is, the style Louis-Philippe."

== Garden design ==
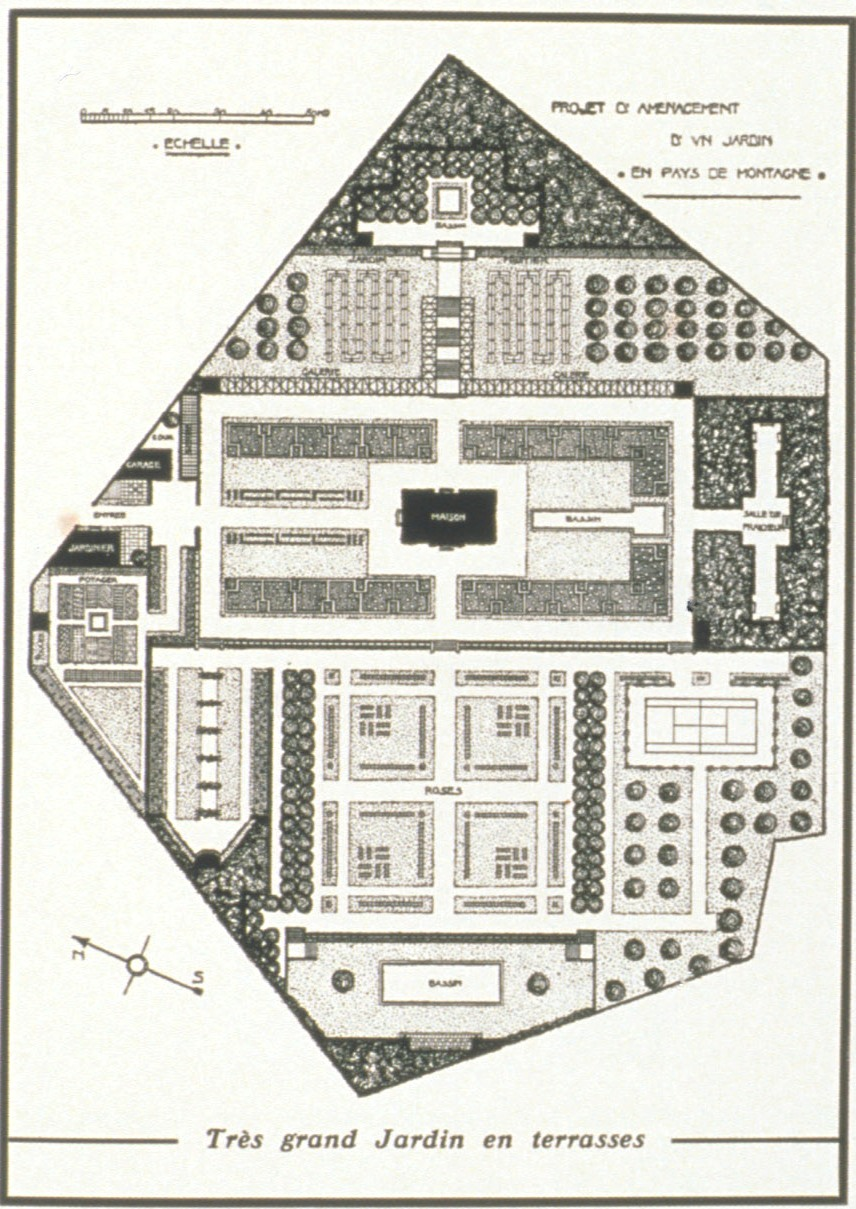
Design for a very large garden from Le nouveau jardin (1912)

The Vera brothers collaborated on formal, geometric garden designs in Art Deco style. They acknowledged the influence of the landscape architect André Le Nôtre (1613–1700) and the great terrace of the Château de Saint-Germain-en-Laye that he designed. Responding in 1912 to a survey of views about Le Nôtre's work, Vera wrote, "We share a liking for the regular garden (jardin régulier). Does it proceed from the lightness of our character or from the gravity of our minds? It surges, rather, from the very nature of the French people." Garden designers in Germany, Britain and the United States during that period were trying to develop distinctive national styles. Vera wanted to design truly French gardens.

In 1912 André and Paul Vera published Le nouveau jardin, with 35 full-page woodblock illustrations and with woodcut designs by Paul Vera on the cover and on the headpiece and tailpiece. The prints give the impression of a handcrafted book. The first two chapters cover André Vera's theories of modern garden design. Later chapters give layouts and descriptions of gardens in rustic, rose-trellised or fantastic style. There are chapters on bee-keeping, cultivation of fruit and ornaments in gardens. The designs were very different from the curvilinear Art Nouveau designs typical of the period, but were aligned with aesthetic views of Le Corbusier, the architect of the machine age. Vera's gardens had a geometrical layout with orthogonal axes, with the lines and pure forms of the composition were emphasized by trees, flower beds and hedges.

Les Jardins (1919) further defined the "regular" modern garden. The American landscape architect Fletcher Steele found that Vera's book "of cubist-dada influence" was "decidedly worthwhile", but mainly due to "the droll woodcuts by M. Paul Vera with which they are illustrated." Steele dismissed Vera's innovations on the basis that he "seems to glorify the curious and original rather than the beautiful." Vera criticized the historical revival of Achille Duchêne. He also felt that the imitation of nature in landscape gardens was artificial. He asserted that garden designs had to be based on the laws of mathematics and geometry, using the golden section and simple forms such as squares and triangles. In 1920 Vera designed a garden for his house in Saint-Germain-en-Laye, working with his brother Paul. The rigidly symmetrical and geometrical design combined classical and modern elements, using topiary, vegetation carefully selected for its colors, and new materials such as reinforced concrete.

Vera's 1950 L'homme at le jardin described past and present gardens, and asserted that the love of gardens was a sign of culture. In the 1950s he was still advocating the French jardin régulier.

== Urbanism and ruralism ==
In 1937 Vera called for "ruralism", creation and protection of national parks and forests, which he felt was equal in importance to urbanism. In his article Nature et urbanisme, published just before World War II (1939–45) he said that it was crucially important to integrate vegetation into town plans. Vera linked man's severance from nature to a fall in physical fitness and a rise in crime and insanity. He recommended preserving sites such as Le Nôtre's terrace at Saint-Germaine-en-Laye, and recreating "incomplete landscapes" that industry had "mutilated" to make continuous green flows spanning several suburban areas. Trees should be part of the urban design, in mass or in isolation, treated as architectural elements and protected against construction. They would help improve the physical and moral state of the town dwellers.

During the war Vera supported Marshal Petain's Vichy government, which he saw as an opportunity to eliminate the "negative style" that had developed in the 1930s, and to renew morals, arts and crafts. He thought urban planners should think less about circulation and more about houses and towns. They should think of the elements of a town – squares, buildings, trees, sculptures and so on – in elevation as well as in plan. He cited the perspective designs of Sebastiano Serlio. Vera disliked the specialization of professions such as engineer and architect, preferring the Renaissance concept of an architect as the master of both gardens and cities.

In his 1941 Manifeste pour le renouveau de l'art français Vera recommended choosing trees and shrubs that were native to the region to show affection to the province, rather than exotics such as Cedar of Lebanon or catalpa. After the devastation of French cities in the war Vera saw an opportunity to plan and rebuild cities designed for modern lifestyles. He wrote an article on this subject in Opportunité de l'urbanisme in Urbanisme (Paris, 1945). In the event, most of the rebuilt cities showed little innovation in their plans.

== Publications ==
- Vera, André; Vera, Paul (1912). Le nouveau jardin; vignettes et ornements dessinés et gravés sur bois by Paul Vera. Paris: Émile-Paul. p. 267. ISBN 978-2-914473-56-9.
- Vëra, André (1914). Le nouveau jardin: conférence donnée par M. André Véra à Anvers le 17 mars 1914 sous les auspices de la Société des Amis des Parcs d'Anvers. J.-E. Buschmann. p. 27.
- Vera, André; Vera, Paul (1919). Les jardins. Emile-Paul Frères. p. 143.
- Vera, André (1925). Modernités ou exaltations sur la vie contemporaine. Librairie de France. p. 76.
- Vera, André (1932). Le petit jardin.
- Vera, André (1936). L'urbanisme, ou, La vie heureuse. R.A. Corréa. p. 244.
- Vera, André (1944). Pour le renouveau de l'art français: Le style nouveau. VI.
- Vera, André (1945). "Opportunité de l'urbanisme". Urbanisme.
- Vera, André (1950). L'homme et le jardin. Plon. p. 253.
- Vera, André (1950). Professeurs de L'université, Faites-nous Des Architectes!.
- Vera, André (1951). Qu'est-ce que l'urbanisme?.
- Vera, André (1952). Hommage à Le Nôtre.

== Sources ==
- A Everitt (2013-03-16). "The Art Deco Garden".
- "André Le Nôtre chez Paul et André Vera à Saint-Germain-en-Laye" (in French). Ministère de la Culture et de la Communication (France).
- Campbell, Gordon (2006-11-09). "Art Deco". The Grove Encyclopedia of Decorative Arts. Oxford University Press. ISBN 978-0-19-518948-3.
- Collectif (2008). Paul et André Vera. Renaud-Bray.
- Conan, Michel (Summer 1994). "Review: Modern Landscape Architecture: A Critical Review edited by Marc Treib; The Modernist Garden in France by Dorothee Imbert". AA Files (27). Architectural Association School of Architecture. JSTOR 29543909.
- Davidson, Gail S (Fall–Winter 2004). "Review of Susan Day, Art Deco and Modernist Carpets". Studies in the Decorative Arts. 12 (1). The University of Chicago Press on behalf of the Bard Graduate Center. doi:10.1086/studdecoarts.12.1.40663103. JSTOR 40663103.
- "Espace Paul et André-Véra". Mairie de Saint Germain en Laye. Archived from the original on 2015-06-21.
- Goss, Jared (2014-09-30). French Art Deco. Metropolitan Museum of Art. ISBN 978-0-300-20430-8.
- Grebler, Leo (March 1956). "Continuity in the Rebuilding of Bombed Cities in Western Europe". American Journal of Sociology. 61 (5). The University of Chicago Press: 463–469. doi:10.1086/221806. JSTOR 2773490. S2CID 144770438.
- Gröning, Gert; Wolschke-Bulmahn, Joachim (2004). "The Native Plant Enthusiasm: Ecological Panacea or Xenophobia?". Arnoldia. 62 (4). Arnold Arboretum of Harvard University: 20–28. JSTOR 42954899.
- "Journeys of the Mind: Architecture and Design". Smithsonian Institution Libraries.
- Karson, Robin S. (2003). Fletcher Steele, Landscape Architect: An Account of the Gardenmaker's Life, 1885-1971. Univ of Massachusetts Press. ISBN 1-55849-413-8.
- "Le nouveau jardin; vignettes et ornements dessinés et gravés sur bois par Paul Vera". Smithsonian Libraries. Archived from the original on 2015-06-22.
- Martin, Sylvie; Wittman, Richard (Spring–Summer 2001). "The École Nationale des Arts Décoratifs in Paris: Architecture and the Applied Arts between the World Wars". Studies in the Decorative Arts. 8 (2). The University of Chicago Press on behalf of the Bard Graduate Center: 77–104. doi:10.1086/studdecoarts.8.2.40662781. JSTOR 40662781. S2CID 192960129.
- "Musée municipal et collections". Mairie de Saint Germain en Laye. Archived from the original on 2015-06-21.
- "The Once Over". Books Abroad. 24 (3). University of Oklahoma: 328–335. Summer 1950. JSTOR 40089470.
- Treib, Marc (2002-09-03). The Architecture of Landscape, 1940-1960. University of Pennsylvania Press. ISBN 0-8122-3623-8.
- Troy, Nancy (Autumn 1984). "Toward a Redefinition of Tradition in French Design, 1895 to 1914". Design Issues. 1 (2). The MIT Press: 53–69. doi:10.2307/1511499. JSTOR 1511499.
- Vercelloni, Matteo; Vercelloni, Virgilio; Gallo, Paola (2010). Inventing the Garden. Getty Publications. ISBN 978-1-60606-047-6.
