= Paul Vera =

French painter and designer (1882-1957)

- Born: 25 December 1882; Paris, France
- Died: 26 November 1957 (aged 74); Saint-Germain-en-Laye, France
- Occupations: Painter and decorator

Paul Vera (1882–1957) was a French painter, designer and pioneer of the Art Deco style. He is known for his collaboration on garden designs with his brother André Vera.

== Life ==
Paul Vera was born in Paris in 1882. His father was Gustave Lėon Vera, an architect, and his older brother André became a garden designer. He was raised in Paris, and became interested in painting while still young. He would often go with Louis Abel-Truchet, an artist, on excursions to paint en plein air. He studied painting for ten years, first at the Académie Julian, then the École des Beaux-Arts and finally at the Académie Ranson. In 1904 he exhibited for the first time at the Salon d'Automne. He was a friend of the artists Roger de La Fresnaye and André Mare of the Puteaux Group. Paul was influenced by cubism based on the mathematical principles of the golden ratio.

The Vera brothers collaborated on formal, geometric garden designs in the Art Deco style. This style originated with the work of Louis Süe. The brothers joined with other artists to create L'Atelier Français, a cooperative business that borrowed organizational idea from the Wiener Werkstätte. The other members included Louis Süe, André Groult, Gustave Louis Jaulmes (1873–1959), Roger de La Fresnaye and André Mare. André Vera wrote a manifesto that defined the goal of the group as combining traditional and modern ideas to bring clarity, order and aesthetic unity to interior design.

During World War I (1914–18) Vera served in the army's camouflage corps, making covers for observation posts and artillery. After the war he joined the Compagnie des Arts Français, which Louis Süe and André Mare had founded as a successor to the Atalier Français. Vera became a decorator for the company, mainly painting the decorations on objects that others had designed. He painted furniture, made wallpaper and textile patterns, printed illustrations and graphic designs, made sketches for tapestry and bas-relief panels. He used a limited number of geometrically abstracted designs drawn from plants, fountains and allegorical or mythical figures. Many of his works were shown in the two pavilions of the Compagnie des Arts Français at the 1925 International Exposition of Modern Industrial and Decorative Arts in Paris. Vera also renewed the tapestry cartoons for the Aubusson workshops and the Beauvais and Gobelins manufacturies. He also drew ceramics for the Manufacture nationale de Sèvres.

Paul Vera settled in Saint-Germain-en-Laye in 1920. The Municipal Museum of Saint-Germain-en-Laye has a large collection of Paul Vera's work, including watercolours, paintings, tapestries, wood engravings, ceramics and porcelain. Many of the items were donated to the city by André Vera. The Espace Paul and André Vera in Saint-Germain-en-Laye is used for temporary exhibitions of work by local and regional artists.

== Publications ==
- Vera, André; Vera, Paul (1912). Le nouveau jardin. Connaissance et mémoires. p. 267. ISBN 978-2-914473-56-9.
- Vera, André; Vera, Paul (1920). Les jardins. Emile-Paul Frères. p. 143.

== Sources ==
- A Everitt (2013-03-16). "The Art Deco Garden".
- Campbell, Gordon (2006-11-09). "Art Deco". The Grove Encyclopedia of Decorative Arts. Oxford University Press. ISBN 978-0-19-518948-3.
- Collectif (2008). Paul et André Vera. Renaud-Bray.
- "Espace Paul et André-Véra". Mairie de Saint Germain en Laye. Archived from the original on 2015-06-21.
- Goss, Jared (2014-09-30). French Art Deco. Metropolitan Museum of Art. ISBN 978-0-300-20430-8.
- "Musée municipal et collections". Mairie de Saint Germain en Laye. Archived from the original on 2015-06-21.
