= Académie Ranson =

Former art school in Paris, France

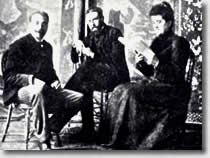
Paul Ranson, Paul Sérusier, and Marie-France Ranson in Paul Ranson's studio, c. 1900.

The Académie Ranson was a private art school founded in 1908 in Paris by the French painter Paul Ranson (1862–1909).

== History ==
The Académie Ranson was founded in 1908 by Paul Ranson (1862–1909), who himself studied at the Académie Julian.

With the untimely death of Paul Ranson in 1909, the Academy was headed by the wife of its founder, Marie-France Ranson. It was first based in Rue Henri Monnier in the 9th arrondissement and then moved to the Montparnasse district, in the Rue Joseph Bara. Maurice Denis and Paul Sérusier delivered courses and Ker-Xavier Roussel, Félix Vallotton, and Édouard Vuillard also attended, which gave it a good reputation. Concetta, former model of Edgar Degas for Les repasseuses and Auguste Rodin for The Kiss, helped its reputation too. Students attended for periods from a week to a year.

In 1914, its teachers were depleted due to World War I, but the Académie Ranson survived despite declining attendance. After 1918, Maurice Denis and Paul Sérusier were occupied with other activities, and new teachers took over, many of them alumni: Yves Alix, Gustave Jaulmes, Paul Vera, Jules-Émile Zingg, Roger Bissière, Louis Latapie, Dimitrios Galanis, and Amédée de la Patellière.

In 1931, Marie-France Ranson handed over the management of the Academy to Harriet Von Tschudi Cérésole, a student and sculptor, originally from the Canton of Glarus in Switzerland. From 1939 to 1944, during World War II, the Academy remains open for a few students. It opened again in 1951 with new teachers, including Roger Chastel, Marcel Fiorini, Lucien Lautrec, Gustave Singier, and Henri Goetz, but due to lack of funds it finally closed in 1955.

== Notable people ==
=== Faculty ===
- Roger Bissière (1886–1964) painter, collagist, stained glass artist
- Maurice Denis (1870–1943) painter
- Gustave Louis Jaulmes (1873–1959) art deco painter
- Georges Hanna Sabbagh (1877–1951) Egyptian-born French painter
- Paul Vera (1882–1957) art deco painter, designer
- Jules-Émile Zingg (1882–1942) modernist painter

=== Alumni ===
- Yves Alix (1890–1969) painter
- Fahrelnissa Zeid (1901–1991) Painter and Princess
- Geoffrey Eastop (1921–2014) potter
