= Gustave Louis Jaulmes =

French artist (1873–1959)

- Born: 14 April 1873; Lausanne, Switzerland
- Died: 7 January 1959 (aged 85); Paris, France
- Occupation: Artist
- Known for: Art Deco

Gustave Louis Jaulmes (14 April 1873 – 7 January 1959) was an eclectic French artist who followed the neoclassical trend in the Art Deco movement. He created monumental frescoes, paintings, posters, illustrations, cartoons for tapestries and carpets and decorations for objects such as enamels, sets of plates and furniture.

== Life ==
=== Early years ===
Gustave Louis Jaulmes was born in Lausanne, Switzerland on 14 April 1873. He attended the École nationale supérieure des Beaux-Arts in Paris. Jaulmes initially trained as an architect, and worked with Victor Laloux at the Gare d'Orsay before taking up painting. In 1902 he abandoned architecture, and after a few months in the studio of Jean-Paul Laurens at the Académie Julian he decided to become a decorative painter.

=== Pre-war period ===
Jaulmes saw his work as a complement and extension of buildings, and made professional and personal links with architects such as Louis Süe. He became known for his monumental frescos and paintings, and for his posters and sets of decorative objects. He worked with Adrien Karbowsky on frescos for the Villa Kerylos and the Palais de Chaillot in 1902–08. They painted the walls of the villa with scenes from Greek mythology chosen by the scholar Théodore Reinach, often copied from Attic pottery. In 1909 Jaulmes and Karbowsky decorated the fashionable Royal-Hôtel in Évian-les-Bains. In 1912 Jaulmes joined other artists to create L'Atalier Français, a cooperative business that borrowed organizational idea from the Wiener Werkstätte. Other members included Louis Süe, Roger de La Fresnaye, André Groult, André Mare and the brothers André and Paul Vera. André Vera wrote a manifesto that defined the goal of the group as combining traditional and modern ideas to bring clarity, order and aesthetic unity to interior design.

=== Post-war ===
In 1919 Jaulmes helped decorate the Victory Celebrations that followed World War I (1914–18). Louis Süe, André Mare, Jaulmes and Antoine Sartorio were commissioned to create the temporary cenotaph of the Arc de Triomphe. That year Süe and the painter André Mare launched the Compagnie des Arts Français, the successor to the L'Atalier Français. Jaulmes was among the artists who contributed textile designs to the company. Others were Marianne Clouzot, Jacques Drésa (André Saglio), Marguérite Dubuisson, Charles Martin, Maurice Taquoy and Paul Vera. Through the company he received many public and private commissions for hotels, casinos, town halls and exhibition rooms. He contributed decorations to the 1921 International Exposition in Ghent, and to the International Expositions in Paris in 1925, 1931 and 1937. He decorated the Musée Rodin and the SS Île de France.

For the Town Hall of the fifth arrondissement in Paris in the La salle des Fêtes Jaulmes made the stage curtain with an allegory of "Letters, Sciences and Law", that represents young women and children adorning a garden with garlands. He also decorated the ceiling of the room with geometric motifs of festivals and garlands. He painted a fresco of Le théâtre antique for the monumental Art Deco Théâtre national de Chaillot, built in 1937. In 1939 he decorated the ceiling of the Salle des Mariages in the Neuilly-sur-Seine town hall. In 1940 he created large murals for the Salle des Pas Perdus in the Centre William Rappard in Geneva, then the headquarters of the International Labour Organization, depicting Dans la joie universelle, Le travail dans l'abondance and Le bienfait des loisirs.

Gustave Louis Jaulmes died in Paris on 7 January 1959.

== Works ==
=== Decorator ===
- 1903–07: Villa Kerylos, Beaulieu-sur-Mer (1903–1907)
- 1903–07: Palais de Chaillot: Frescos in the grand foyer with Louis Süe
- 1909: Frescos and enamels at the Royal Palace in Evian
- 1911: Synagogue of Boulogne-Billancourt
- 1911: The Hôtel de Ville in Arras: decoration of the wedding room
- 1918: Musée Rodin: Decoration of the salle du Baiser
- 1919: Decoration of the Fêtes de la Victoire, Avenue de la Grande Armée, with André Mare and Louis Süe
- 1923: Frescoes of the Temple protestant de Reims, covered by whitewash in 1972
- 1925: Décoration of the SS Île de France with Louis Süe
- 1925: International Exposition of Modern Industrial and Decorative Arts in Paris
- 1931: Paris Colonial Exposition
- 1934: Théâtre de Carcassonne
- 1935: Hôtel de Ville in Cachan
- 1937: Exposition Internationale des Arts et Techniques dans la Vie Moderne
- 1937: Théâtre du Trocadéro; (now Théâtre national de Chaillot), foyer and vestibule with Jean Niermans, Édouard Niermans and Louis Süe
- 1939: Dining room of the wedding room of the Hôtel de Ville in Neuilly-sur-Seine
- 1940: Paintings in the salle des Pas-Perdus of the Centre William Rappard
- Church of Saint-Nicaise in Reims
- Frescoes and the stage curtain of the hall of the Town Hall of the fifth arrondissement in Paris
- The musée A.-G. Poulain in Vernon, Eure displays three decorative wall panels from the dining room of Paul Noccard in Neuilly.
- Uccle (Brussels): Frescos of the Château de La Fougeraie, built by Louis Süe for the industrialist Paul Wittouck
- Hôtel Bristol, Rue du Faubourg Saint-Honoré in Paris: Art Nouveau panel of the Four Seasons Jaulmes also painted the coffered ceiling of Le Bristol's Restaurant d'Hiver in classical motifs.
- Villa Nocard, Neuilly

=== Paintings ===
- Arras: Canvases for the dining room of honor of the Exposition des Arts décoratifs of 1925
- 1925: The French national coat of arms on a tapestry, titled "Les armes de France". Commissioned by the city of Strasbourg, this piece was to be installed at the Commissariat General of the Republic in the city.
- Musée départemental de l'Oise in Beauvai: Several canvases including one of "Madame Jaulmes et sa fille"
- Musée des années trente at Boulogne-Billancourt: Canvas of Simone, daughter of the artist, on the terrace of the Villa Kerylos

=== Illustrations ===
- Various books by Frédéric Mistral
- 1921 Poster for the Salon d'Automne
- 1927 Christmas edition of L'Illustration
- 1945 Le Cantique des Cantiques, Paris, Les Éditions Universelles

== Sources ==
- Denby, Elaine (2002-03-27). Grand Hotels: Reality and Illusion. Reaktion Books. ISBN 978-1-86189-121-1.
- "Des décors de rêve par des décorateurs historiques". Evian Resort.
- Feltkamp, Ronald (2003). Théo van Rysselberghe, 1862–1926. Lannoo Uitgeverij. ISBN 978-2-85917-389-0.
- Goss, Jared (2014-09-30). French Art Deco. Metropolitan Museum of Art. ISBN 978-0-300-20430-8.
- "Gustave-Louis Jaulmes (1873–1959)". BnF.
- "Gustave Louis Jaulmes: Pour la pensée universelle et créatrice" (in French). Théâtre National de Chaillot. Archived from the original on 2015-06-23.
- "Histoire" (PDF). Neuilly-sur-Seine.
- Jackson, Lesley (2007-02-08). Twentieth Century Pattern Design. Princeton Architectural Press. ISBN 978-1-56898-712-5.
- Lefrançois, Michèle; Landowski, Paul Maximilien (2009). Paul Landowski: l'œuvre sculpté. creaphis editions. ISBN 978-2-35428-023-9.
- "Les salles de cérémonie" (in French). Mairie du 5e. Archived from the original on 2015-02-11.
- Pujolas, Marie (2015-04-17). "Le théâtre National de Chaillot cherche des mécènes pour sa rénovation". France TV.
- "Simone enfant au balcon de la Villa Kérylos de Théodore Reinach 1906 par JAULMES Gustave-Louis". Association des amis du musée des Années 30.
- Steen, Thomas Prebensen (2002-01-28). Remarkable Hotels of Europe: Ten Classics Thoroughly Reviewed in the Spirit of Genuine Travelling. Xlibris Corporation. ISBN 978-1-4628-0638-6.
- True, Marion; Silvetti, Jorge; Settis, Salvatore (2005). The Getty Villa. Getty Publications. ISBN 978-0-89236-841-9.
- "Works of art". WTO: World Trade Organization.
