= Adrien Karbowsky =

French painter

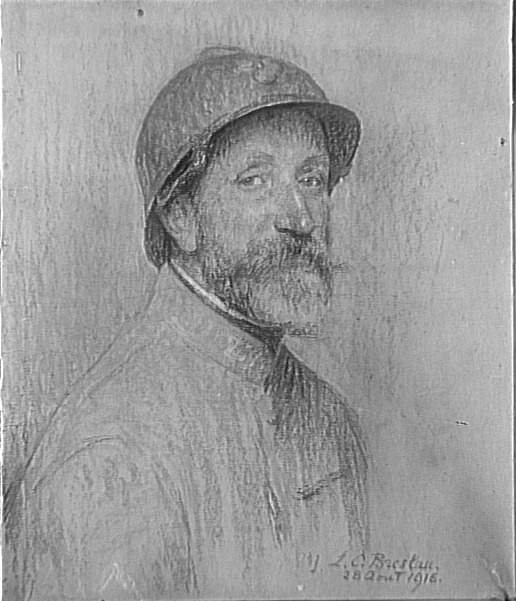
- Karbowsky in August 1916 by Louise Catherine Breslau
- Born: 15 December 1855; Paris, France
- Died: 14 March 1945 (aged 89); Paris, France
- Occupations: Painter, decorator and architect
- Known for: Art Nouveau

Adrien Karbowsky (15 December 1855 – 14 March 1945) was a French painter, decorator and architect. He is known for his Art Nouveau murals and tapestry designs.

== Life ==
Adrien Karbowsky was born on 15 December 1855. He was a pupil of Jean-Baptiste Lavastre, who decorated the Paris Opera, and of Justin Lequien. Karbowski also studied under Pierre Puvis de Chavannes. His Le bras Mignot, à Poissy was exhibited at the Salon of the Société des Artistes Français in 1881 in the Palais des Champs-Élysées, Paris. On 1 May 1886 his Calendrier républicain was shown at the Salon. At the Salon of 1889 he received an honorable mention.

Karbowsky became a leading decorator in the Art Nouveau style. He collaborated with Frantz Jourdain and Puvis de Chavannes. Karbowsky was made a knight of the Legion of Honour in 1902. He became a member of the Société de l'Art à L'École, founded in 1906 with the aim of improving public taste by teaching public school students about art and decorating the schools.

In 1914, at age 59, Karbowsky enlisted in the 65th Infantry Regiment where his age earned the nickname “Grand-Père” (“grandfather”). He was wounded at Soupir and fought as a sergeant at the Mort Homme. A reviewer for American Art News wrote in February 1918,

Adrien Karbowsky shows, at the Petit Galleries also, a series of sketches of the heads of soldiers that are without distinctive merit, being for the most part wooden and characterless. But in the same room are 3 paintings of flowers by the same hand that are almost as wonderful, in delicacy of coloration and in truth of form, as Nature itself. One wonders how such an artist can be drawn away, even by the stern impressions of his life as a soldier at the front, from that vocation to excellent achievement which is incontestably his. I do not think that any French painter, now living, has better succeeded in the painting of flowers.

In 1923 Karbowsky was among the 27 dissenting members of the board of the Société Nationale des Beaux-Arts who formed a new and more eclectic Salon with the encouragement of the Minister of Fine Arts. The plan was to exhibit paintings and sculptures ranging in style from the most conservative to the most advanced. The Salon would be held in springtime, at the peak season for visitors to Paris.

Adrien Karbowsky died on 14 March 1945, aged 89.

== Selected works ==
Karbowsky contributed decorative tapestry designs for the Manufacture Nationale des Gobelins. He also designed tapestries for the Manufacture Nationale de Tapisseries de Beauvais. He designed the decorative silk tapestries in pink for the Salon du Bois in the Museum of Decorative Arts, opened in 1900 in the Pavilion de Marsan of the Louvre Palace. Murals include:

- 1893: Decorative murals in the Château de Verteuil, Charente, whose library Jourdain remodelled in 1893.
- 1903–07: With Louis Jaulmes, murals for the Villa Kerylos in Cap-Ferrat, as directed by the Hellenic scholar Théodore Reinach, in mythological scenes often copied from Attic pottery.
- 1909: Also with Jaulmes, decoration of the dining room of the exclusive Hôtel Royal in Évian-les-Bains.
- Frescoes for the dining room of the Hôtel Lutétia in Paris and the Hôtel de Ville in Nogent-sur-Marne.
- 1920s Decoration of the Domaine de Montaigu in Nancy in collaboration with the local architect Pierre le Bourgeon. The house had been purchased in 1920 by the Salin family, but had burned down. It was restored using new techniques such as reinforced concrete and a metal framework.
- 1925: Stenciled paintings for La Maison Commune du Chemin Vert in Reims, a theater inaugurated in February 1925
- Murals for the dining room of the Prince of Monaco.

== Salons and exhibitions ==
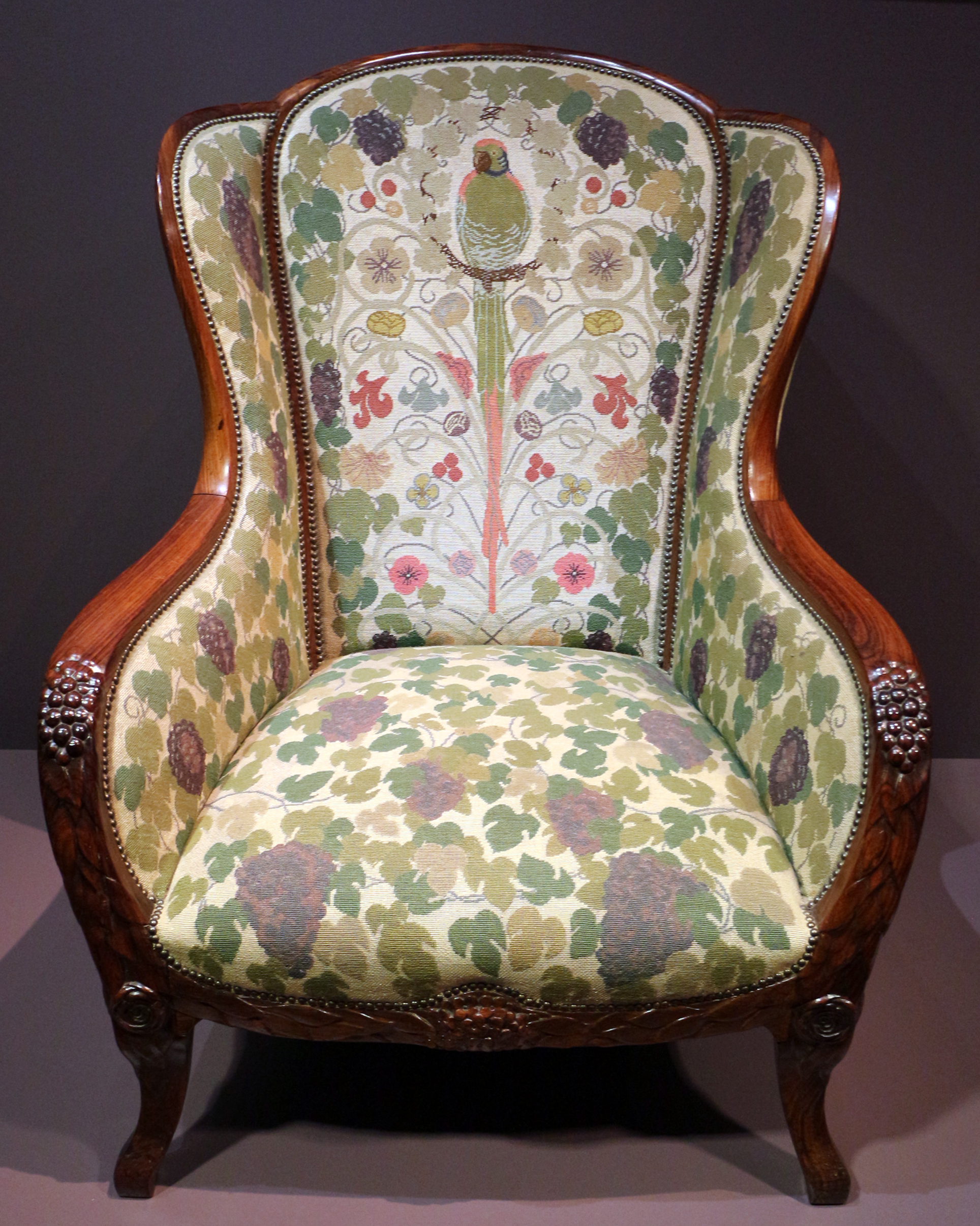
Armchair by Adrien Karbowsky, Paris 1912–13, Musée d'Orsay

- 1881: Salon des artistes français
- 1886: Salon of the Société des artistes français
- 1900: Exposition Universelle of Paris
- 1907: Salon La Nationale des beaux-arts : Mimosas et faïences
- 1910: Brussels International
- 1913: Salon de la Société nationale des beaux-arts : Musiciens
- 1923: Salon des Tuileries
- 1928: Galerie Ecalle, 3 Faubourg-Saint-Honoré à Paris
- 1945: Salon des Tuileries : Rétrospective de l'Œuvre d'Adrien Karbowsky

== Sources ==
- Ajalbert, Jean (1933). Les Peintres de la Manufacture Nationale de Tapisseries de Beauvais. Adrien Karbowsky - O.-D.-V. Guillonnet - Jean Saint-Paul - Jean Gadenne - Rochepierre. P., Eugène Rey.
- Auzias, Dominique; Labourdette, Jean-Paul (2012-07-05). Nancy 2012-2013 (avec photos et avis des lecteurs). Petit Futé. ISBN 978-2-7469-5521-9.
- Barker, Michael (1993). "Aspects Of The Continuing Arts and Crafts Tradition - Architectural Decoration In France In the 1920s & 1930s". The Journal of the Decorative Arts Society 1850 - the Present, No. 17, the Enduring Tradition: Craft and Design in the Inter-War Years (17). The Decorative Arts Society 1850 to the Present: 67–79. JSTOR 41809215.
- B.D. (1918-02-23). "Works by Belzet and Karbowsky". American Art News. 16 (20): 1–10. JSTOR 25589237.
- Campbell, Gordon (2006-11-09). The Grove Encyclopedia of Decorative Arts. Oxford University Press. ISBN 978-0-19-518948-3.
- Clausen, Meredith L. (1987). Décoration & Le Rationalisme Architecturaux a L'Exposition Universelle. Brill Archive. ISBN 90-04-07879-7.
- Ciolkowska, Muriel (1923-03-10). "New Salon Formed by Paris Artists". The Art News. 21 (22): 1–12. JSTOR 25591247.
- "Karbowsky, Adrien (1855-1945)" (in French). BnF.
- Possémé, Évelyne (2015). "Salon du Bois". Les Arts Décoratifs.
- Salon de peinture et de sculpture (1889). Le Livre d'or du Salon de peinture et de sculpture: catalogue descriptif des oeuvres récompensées et des principales oeuvres hors concours.
- Société des artistes français. Salon (1881). Explication des ouvrages de peinture, sculpture, architecture, gravure, et lithographie des artistes vivants exposés au Grand palais des Champs-Élysées.
- Société des artistes français (1886). Explication des ouvrages de peinture, sculpture, architecture, gravure, et lithographie des artistes vivants exposés au Palais des Champs-Elysées ... Charles de Mourgues frères; E. Bernard; Paul Dupont [et al.].
- "Still Life by Adrien Karbowsky (French, 1855-1945)". Studio Antiques & Fine Art. Archived from the original on 2015-07-06.
- "Théâtre du Chemin Vert". Flaneries Musicales de Reims. Archived from the original on 2015-07-06.
- True, Marion; Silvetti, Jorge; Settis, Salvatore (2005). The Getty Villa. Getty Publications. ISBN 978-0-89236-841-9.
