= Villa Kerylos =

House in Beaulieu-sur-Mer, France

Coordinates: 43°42′11.5″N 7°20′2″E

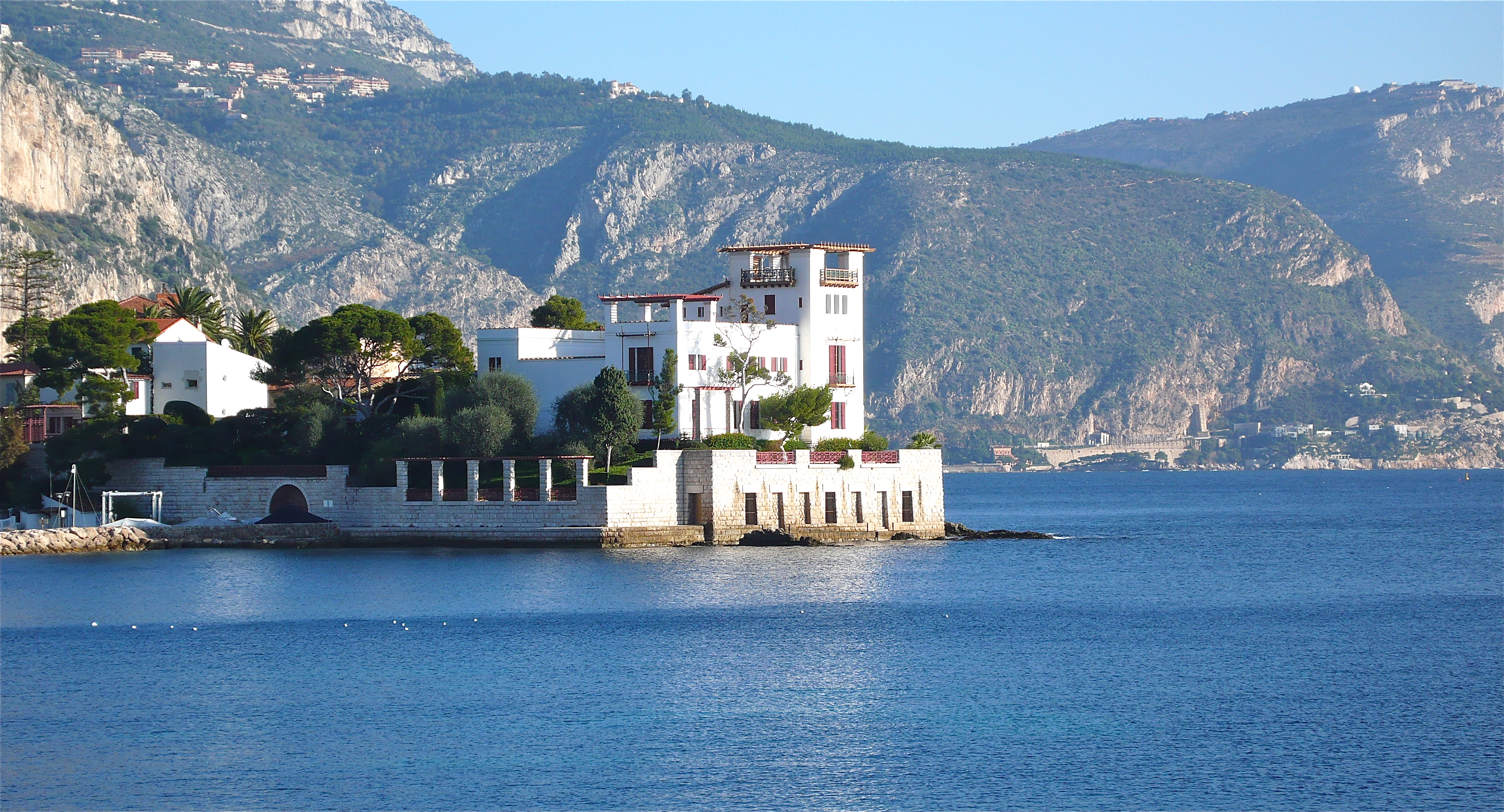
View of the Villa Kerylos

Villa Kerylos in Beaulieu-sur-Mer, France, is a house in Ancient Greek Revival style built in the early 1900s by French architect Emmanuel Pontremoli. It has been listed since 1966 as a monument historique by the French Ministry of Culture.

A Greek word, kerylos means halcyon or kingfisher, which in Greek mythology was considered a bird of good omen.

== History ==
The villa was built in the early 1900s for French archaeologist Theodore Reinach, and his wife Fanny Kann, a daughter of Maximilien Kann and Betty Ephrussi, of the Ephrussi family. Madame Fanny Reinach was a cousin of Maurice Ephrussi, who was married to Béatrice de Rothschild. Inspired by the beauty of the Reinachs' Villa Kerylos and the area, they built the Villa Ephrussi de Rothschild at nearby Cap Ferrat.

Reinach admired the architecture, interior decoration and art of the ancient world and decided to recreate the atmosphere of a luxurious Greek house in a new building. He purchased land surrounded on three sides by the sea on the tip of the Baie des Fourmis at Beaulieu-sur-Mer, which he felt offered a location similar to that of coastal Greek temples.

Reinach selected as architect Emmanuel Pontremoli, who drawing on his travels in Asia Minor designed a reconstruction of the Greek noble houses built on the island of Delos in the 2nd century B.C. and laid out the building around an open peristyle courtyard.

=== Features ===
Construction of the building began in 1902 and took six years to complete. The interior integrated influences from Rome, Pompeii and Egypt with the interior decoration overseen by Gustave Louis Jaulmes and Adrien Karbowsky. Stucco bas-reliefs were created by sculptor Paul Jean-Bapiste Gascq.

Reinach commissioned exact copies of ancient Grecian chairs, tabourets and klismos furniture kept in the National Archaeological Museum in Naples from the cabinetmaker Bettenfeld. Other decorations were to original designs by Pontremoli.

The building incorporated all the latest early 20th-century features, including plumbing and underfloor heating.

== Present day ==
Upon his death in 1928, Reinach bequeathed the property to the Institut de France, of which he had been a member. His children and grandchildren continued to live there until 1967. It is now a museum open to the public.

== Image gallery ==
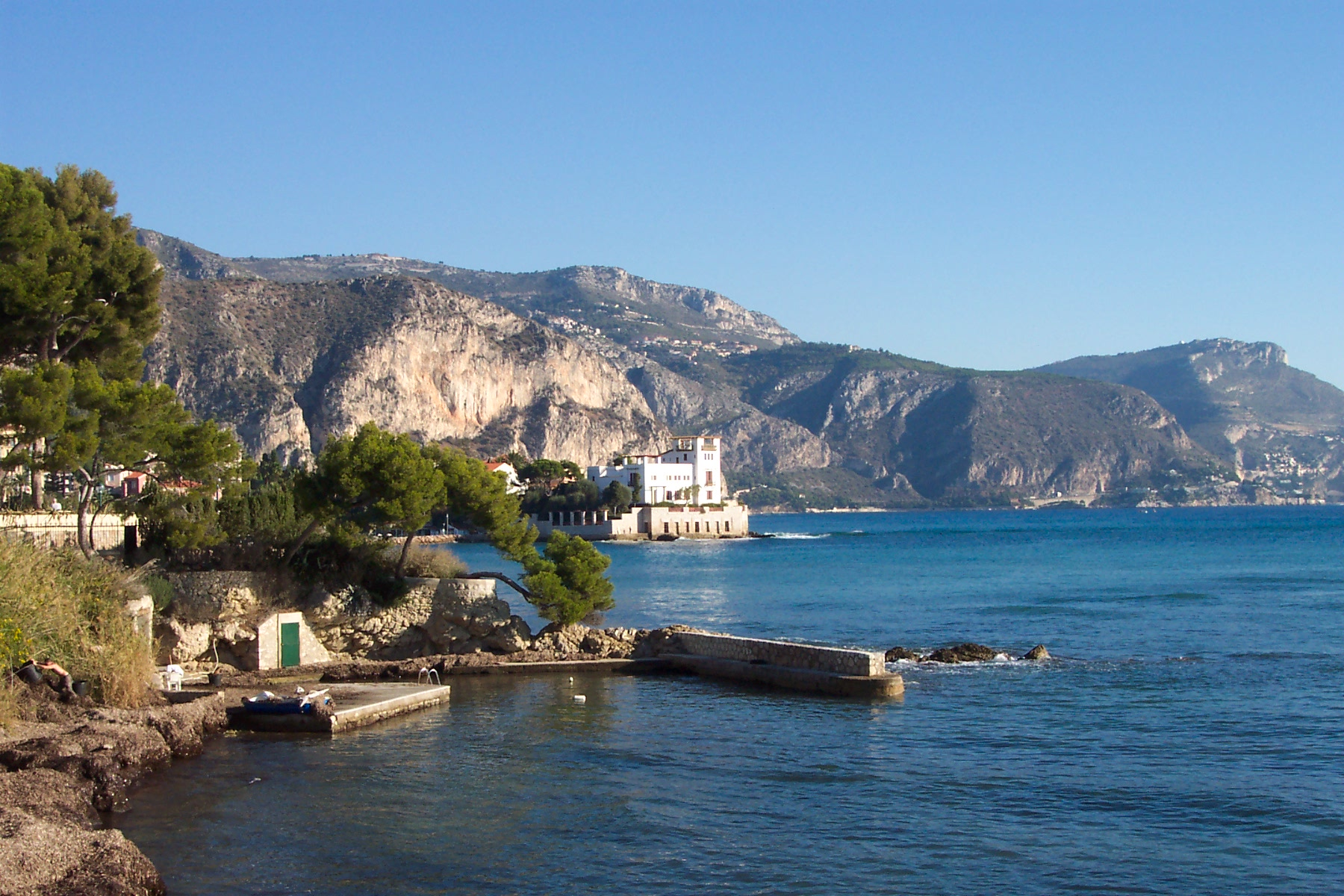

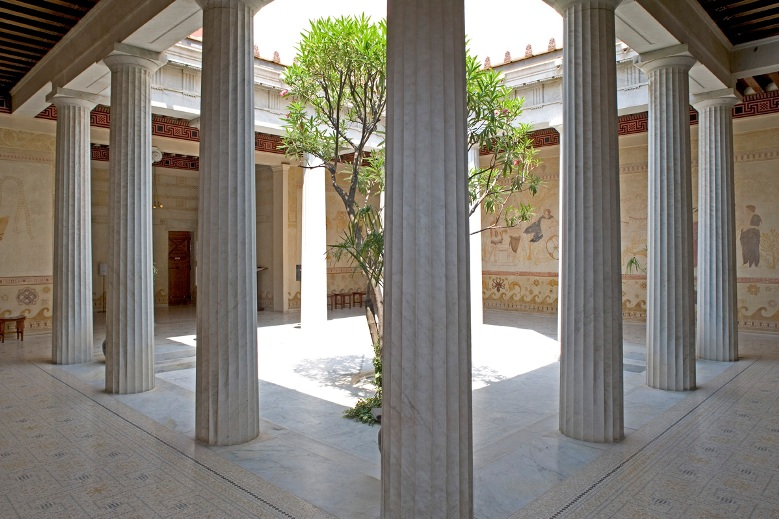

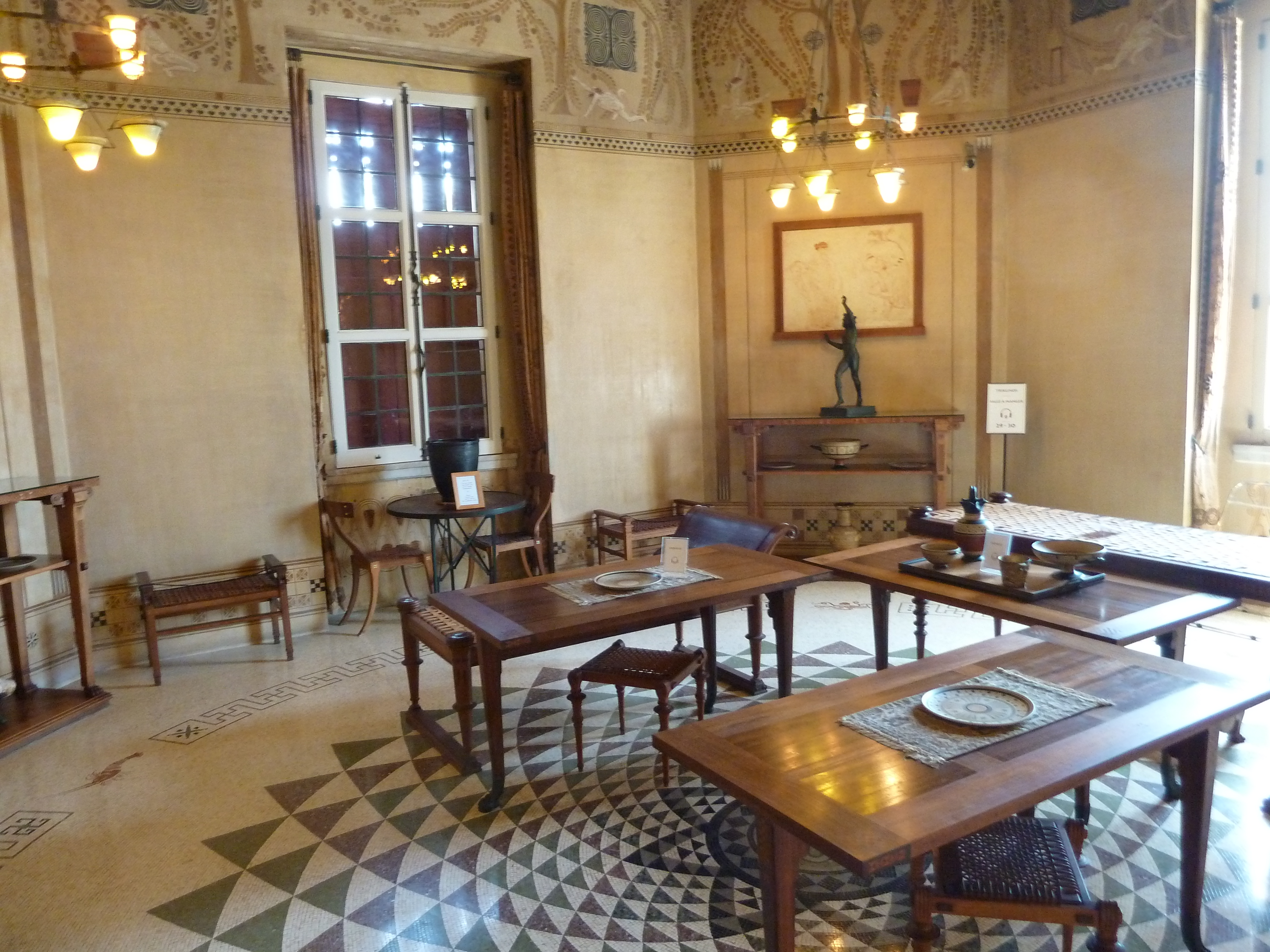

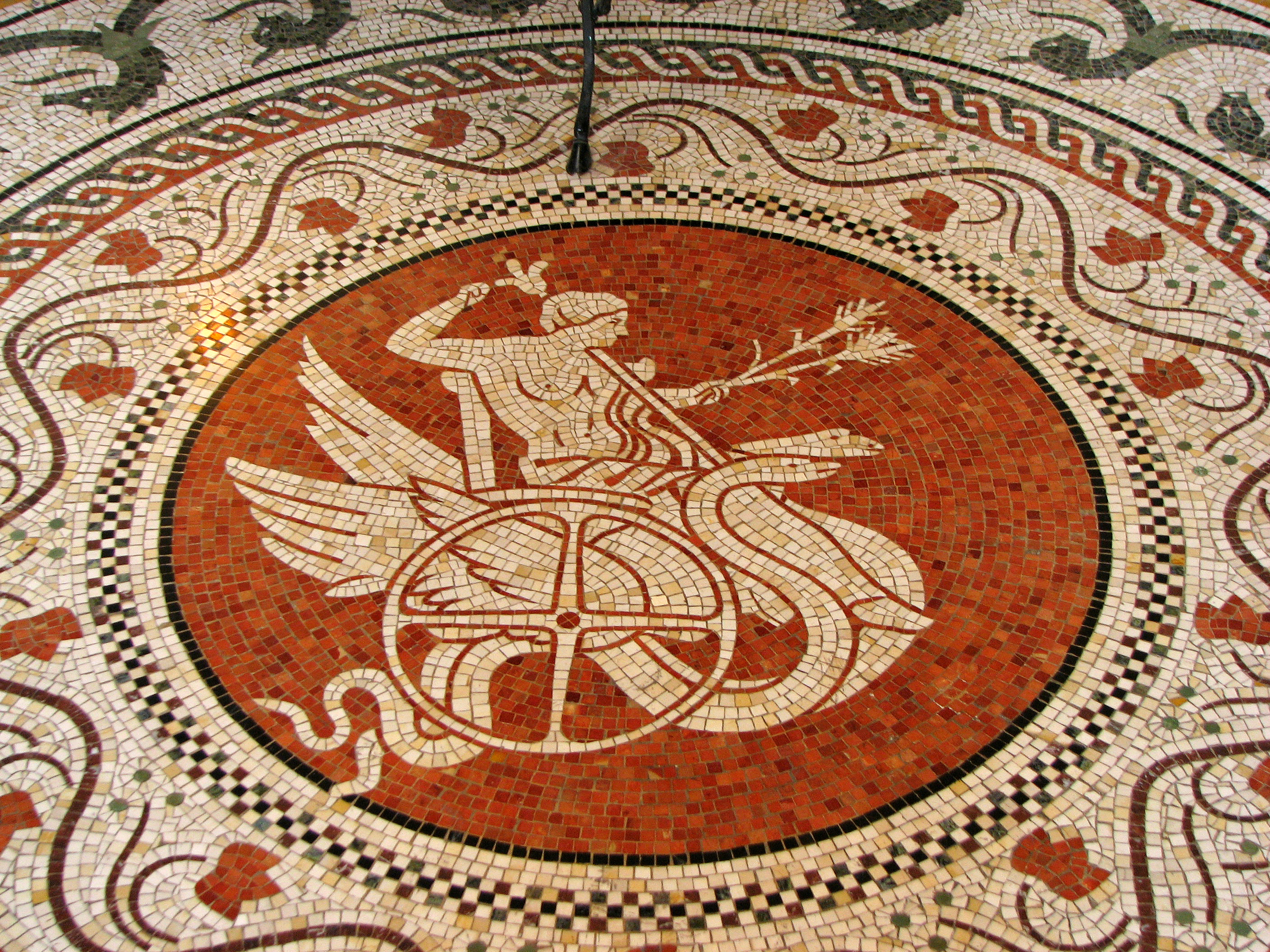

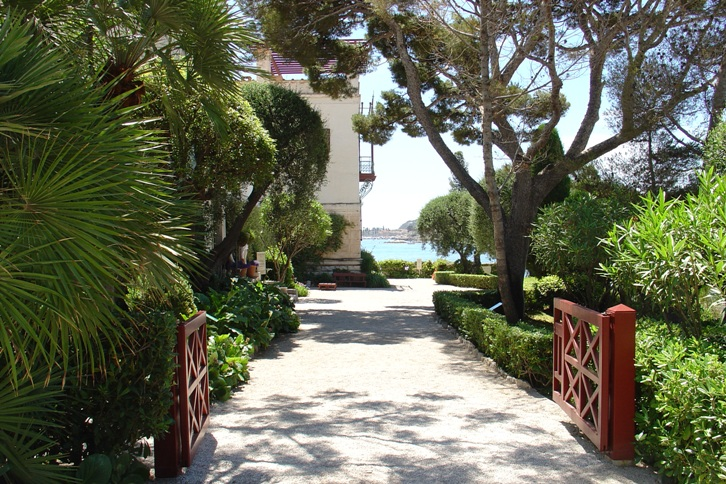

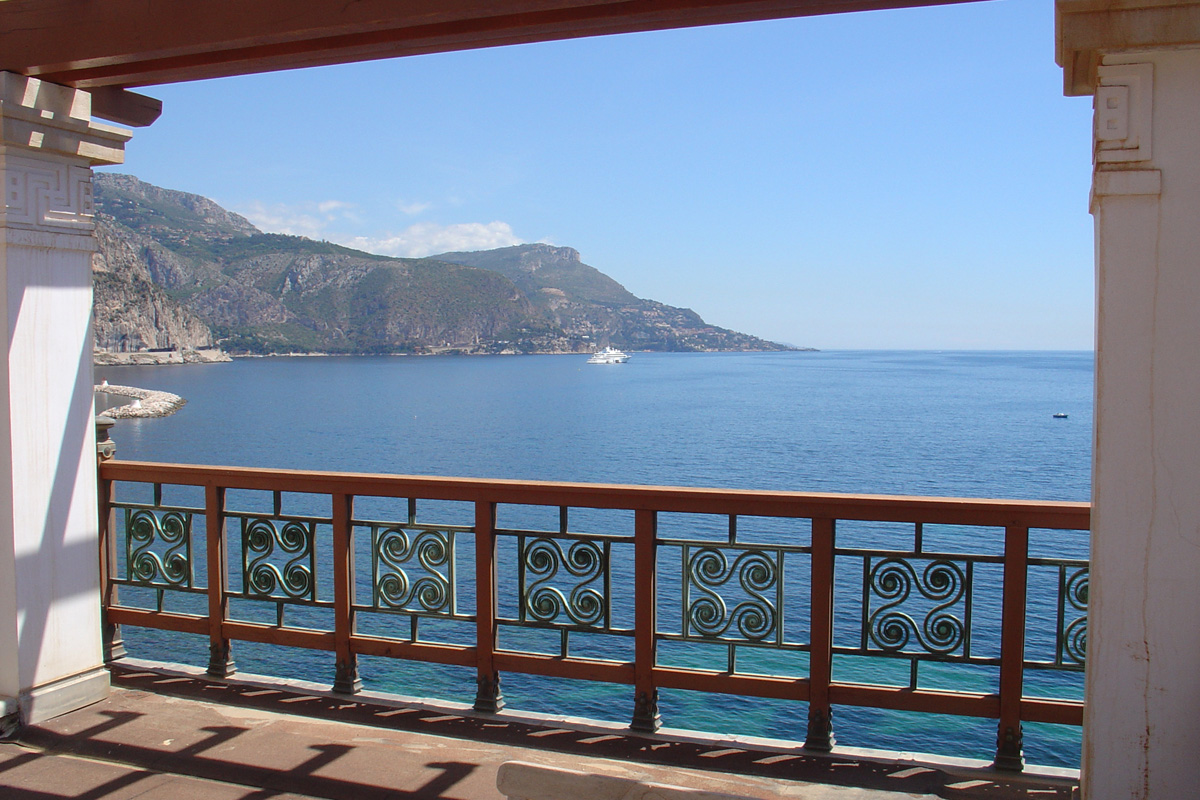
