= Louis Süe =

French painter, architect, designer and decorator (1875 - 1968)

- Louis Süe in 1937
- Born: Marie-Louis Süe; 14 July 1875; Bordeaux, France
- Died: 7 August 1968 (aged 93); Paris, France
- Occupations: Painter, designer and architect

Louis Süe (14 July 1875 – 7 August 1968) was a French painter, architect, designer and decorator. He and André Mare co-founded the Compagnie des arts français, which produced Art Deco furniture and interior decorations for wealthy customers. He also designed buildings and interiors, including the interiors of two passenger liners.

== Early years ==
Marie-Louis Süe was born on 14 July 1875 in Bordeaux. He was the grand nephew of the writer Eugène Sue. His father was a wine merchant. After graduating from secondary school he entered the Collège Sainte-Barbe in Paris to prepare for the École Polytechnique. However, in 1893 he left Sainte-Barbe and entered the École des Beaux-Arts where he studied painting in the studio of Victor Laloux (1850–1937). During this period he also explored architectural design, and was awarded medals for his work. He gained his diploma in 1901.

Süe made friends at the Beaux-Arts with the painters Pierre Bonnard, Roger de La Fresnaye, André Derain and André Dunoyer de Segonzac. In 1902 the Salon des Indépendants and the Salon d'Automne showed his work. Süe's work always combined an understanding and respect for traditional forms with a willingness to explore the new.

== Pre-War ==
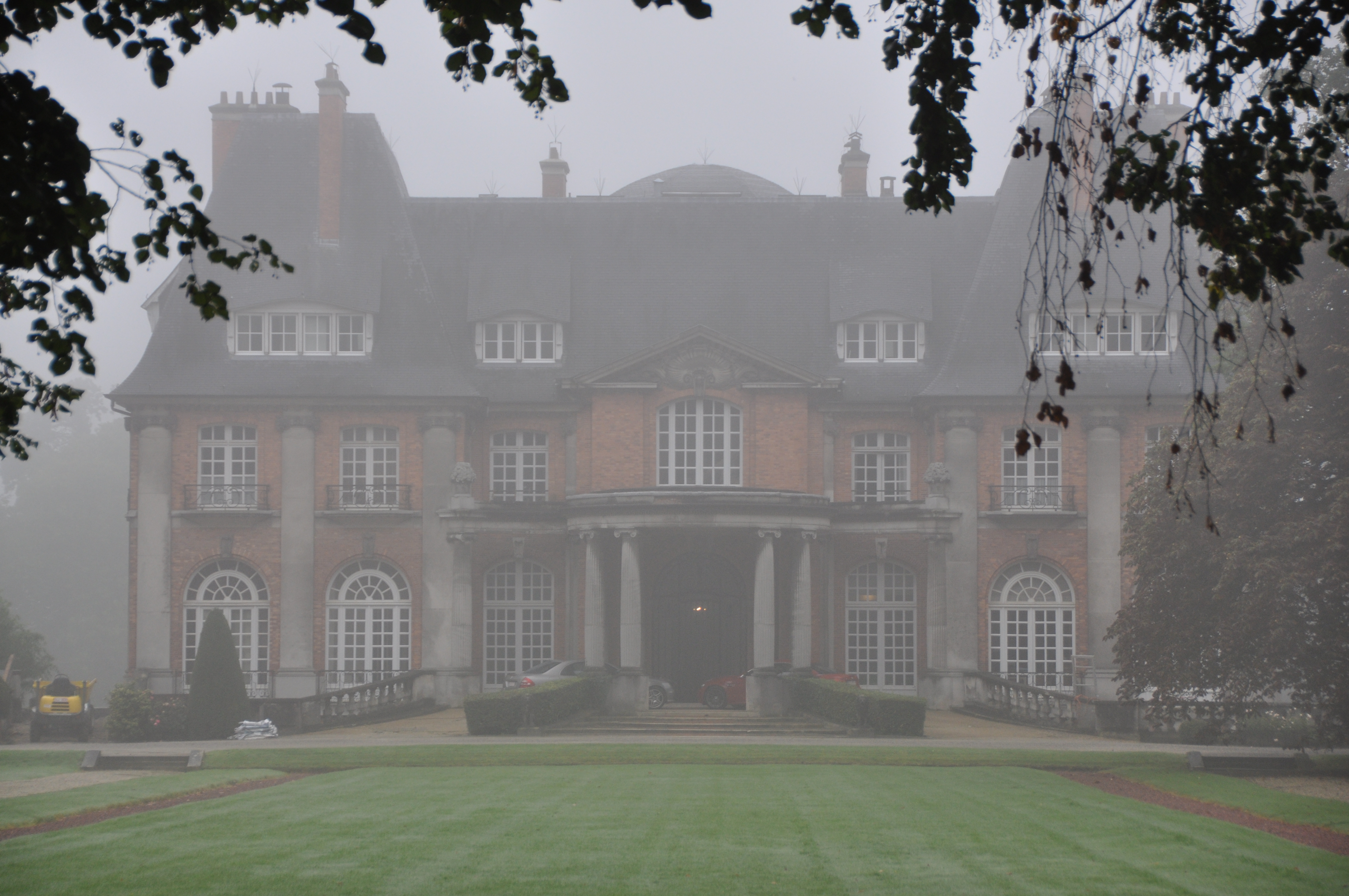
Château de La Fougeraie (1911) designed by Süe for Paul Wittouck, decorated by Gustave Louis Jaulmes

Starting in 1903 Süe and Paul Huillard collaborated in building artists' workshops and buildings in Paris on the Rue Cassini, Boulevard Raspail and Boulevard du Montparnasse. In 1910 Süe travelled with Paul Poiret to Vienna to visit the Wiener Werkstätte. Süe was exposed to cubism around 1910, and this influenced his architectural designs. He exhibited a complete room setting at the 1910 Salon d'Automne, and would participate in the Paris Salons through the rest of his career.

Süe and Huillard ended their partnership in 1912. Süe joined other artists to create L'Atalier Français, a cooperative business that borrowed organizational idea from the Wiener Werkstätte. The members included Süe, Roger de La Fresnaye, André Groult, Gustave Louis Jaulmes (1873–1959), and the brothers André and Paul Vera. André Vera wrote a manifesto that defined the goal of the group as combining traditional and modern ideas to bring clarity, order and aesthetic unity to interior design. Süe helped decorate Groult's house. During the war the Atelier was dissolved. Süe was drafted into the army and served in the south of Greece. Louis Süe, André Mare and Gustave Jaulmes collaborated in 1919 in decorating the victory festivals in Paris.

== Compagnie des arts français ==
In 1919 Süe and André Mare founded the Compagnie des arts français (French Arts Company) and in 1921 published their first designs of furniture, wallpaper, tapestries, silverware and ceramics. The company employed many artists and craftsmen to meet the needs of their sophisticated and wealthy clientele for interior decoration. The Metropolitan Museum acquired examples of their furniture as early as 1923. Their Art Deco works, typically with flower designs, were both elegant and practical. Süe and Mare decorated interiors such as the Polish Embassy in Paris and the home of Jean Patou. In their joint work Architectures (1921) Sue and Mare asserted that Art Nouveau was based on a synthesis of fine and decorative arts. Their commercial designs often had simplified forms with rich materials.

In 1922 Süe designed the industrial town of Lens-Méricourt for the French Northern Railway company. In 1922 the Compagnie des arts français obtained financial support from Gaston Monteux, owner of the Raoul shoe firm. Süe and Mare worked together again for the 1925 International Exposition of Modern Industrial and Decorative Arts in Paris, where they built a contemporary art museum and the Fountain pavilion on the Esplanade des Invalides. They showed a luxurious room in the grand salon with furniture, carpet, wallpaper and decorations in new forms linked to traditional designs. They also collaborated that year on the interior decoration of the SS Île de France. Louis Süe, or Süe at Mare, designed all the perfume bottles and boxes for Jean Patou. They also designed bottles for other perfumers, including the bottle for "Le Dandy" of D'Orsay. Monteux sold the Compagnie des arts français to the Galeries Lafayette department store in 1928. The new owners brought in Jacques Adnet, a modernist designer, and Sue and Mare left the firm due to disagreement with Adnet.

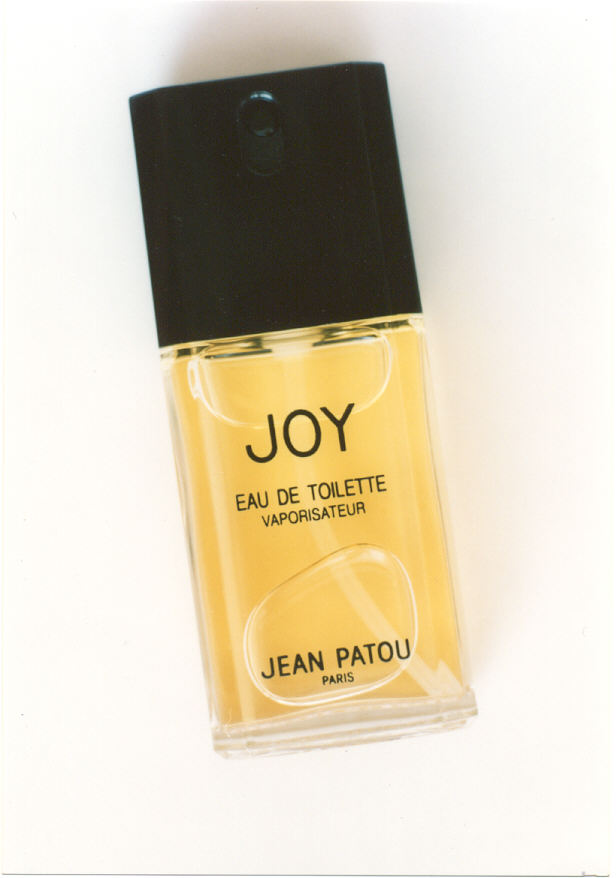
Bottle for Jean Patou's parfum Joy designed by Louis Süe (1929)

== Later career ==
After leaving the Compagnie des arts français Louis Süe worked as an independent architect-decorator, and designed buildings for various well-known figures. Between 1929 and 1931 he built a Basque villa in Ustaritz for Jean Patou. Between 1934 and 1937 he reconstructed for Helena Rubinstein a run-down building, the Hôtel Hesselin, on the Quai de Béthune in Paris, converting it in an elegant and luxurious mansion. He also landscaped Rubinstein's beauty institute on the Rue du Faubourg Saint-Honoré. He entered the competition to camouflage the Trocadéro palace for the Exposition Internationale des Arts et Techniques dans la Vie Moderne of 1937, and collaborated with Jean and Édouard Niermans (sons of Édouard-Jean Niermans) in building the theater of the new palace.

Süe was treasurer of the Société des artistes décorateurs from 1936 to 1937. In 1939 he was named president of the Société des artistes décorateurs. For its Salon he designed a street's decorations and the Helena Rubinstein and Louis Süe booths. He built the French Village for the 1939 New York World's Fair. Süe lived in Istanbul and lectured at the Institute of Fine Arts during World War II (1939–45). After the war he built an industrial town in Rupt-sur-Moselle, Vosges, the Museum of the Annunciation in Saint-Tropez, and many villas and private residences. He also created theater sets and interior decorations, including the interior of the SS Jean-Mermoz in 1957. Louis Süe died in Paris on 7 August 1968. Süe had become a chevalier of the Legion of Honour in 1925, and was elected an officer in 1936.

== Publications ==
- Mare, André; Süe, Louis (1921). Architectures. Éditions de la Nouvelle revue français.
- Vaillat, Léandre; Süe, Louis (1923). Le rythme de l'architecture. François Bernouard. p. 67.
- Süe, Louis; Badovici, Jean; Maré, André (1924). Intérieurs de Süe et Mare. A. Morancé. p. 14.
- Zahar, Marcel; Süe, Louis; Lochak, M. B. (1925). Un immeuble, quai de Béthune: L. Sue, architecte. L'art vivant. p. 16.
- Segonzac, André Dunoyer de; Süe, Louis (1953). Musée de l'Annonciade, Saint-Tropez. p. 8.
- Süe, Louis (1959). Louis Süe et ses amis. Galerie Romanet.
- Segonzac, André Dunoyer de; Süe, Louis (1959). Musée de l'Annonciade: Saint-Tropez. Préfaces par... [André] Dunoyer de Segonzac, Louis Süe. "Art et style" (impr. Desfossés). p. 10.
- Süe, Louis; Drouot (1968). Louis Süe et Suzanne Bernouard, 2e vente: aquarelles, dessins, peintures. Hôtel Drouot. p. 23.
- Foulk, Raymond; Süe, Marie-Louis; Mare, André (1979). The Extraordinary Work of Süe Et Mare: La Compagnie Des Arts Français : Marie-Louis Süe (1875-1968) : André Mare (1887-1932). Foulk Lewis Collection. p. 87.
- Day, Susan; Süe, Louis (1986). Louis Süe, 1875-1968: architecte des années folles, associé d'André Mare. P. Mardaga. p. 87.

== Sources ==
- Banham, Joanna (2015-04-24). Encyclopedia of Interior Design. Taylor & Francis. ISBN 978-1-136-78757-7.
- Goss, Jared (2014-09-30). French Art Deco. Metropolitan Museum of Art. ISBN 978-0-300-20430-8.
- Husfloen, Kyle; Dolnick, Penny (2009-01-26). Antique Trader Perfume Bottles Price Guide. Krause Publications. ISBN 978-1-4402-1914-6.
- "Louis Süe and André Mare (Süe et Mare)". High Style Deco. 3 March 2015. Archived from the original on 18 May 2015.
- "Louis Süe biographie" (in French). Cité de l’architecture et du patrimoine. Archived from the original on 2015-04-06.
- Pile, John F. (2005). A history of interior design. Laurence King Publishing. ISBN 978-1-85669-418-6.
- Woodhead, Lindy (2010-12-15). War Paint: Madame Helena Rubinstein and Miss Elizabeth Arden: Their Lives, Their Times, Their Rivalry. John Wiley & Sons. ISBN 978-1-118-04003-4.

== See also ==
- Art Deco in Paris
