= Écorches =

- Commune
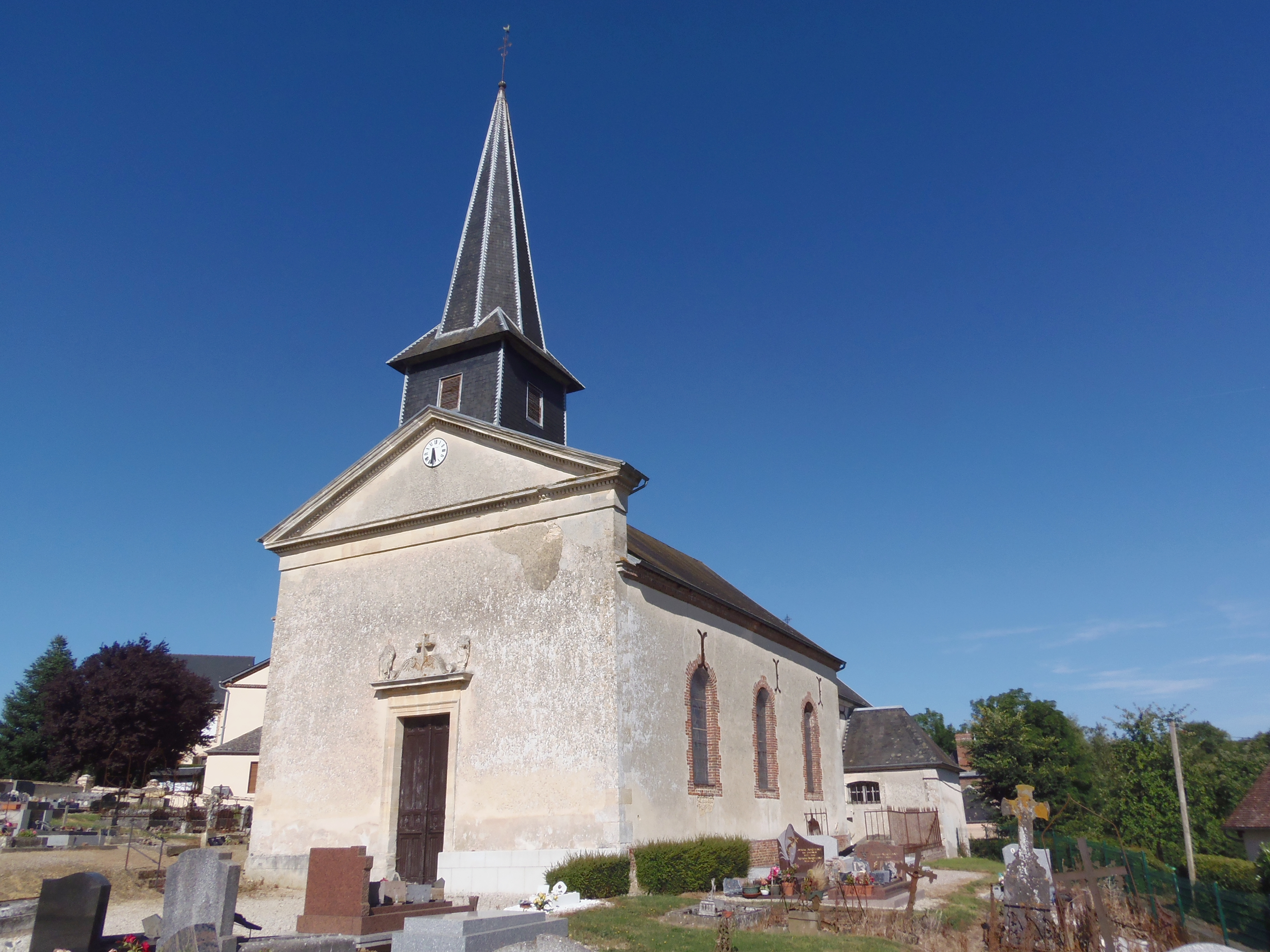
- The church of Saint-Agnan in Écorches
- Location of Écorches
- Location within France Location within Normandy
- Coordinates: 48°52′04″N 0°05′37″E
- Country: France
- Region: Normandy
- Department: Orne
- Arrondissement: Argentan
- Canton: Argentan-2
- Intercommunality: Terres d'Argentan Interco

Government
  - Mayor (2020–2026): Thierry Couanon
- Area^{1}: 9.71 km^{2} (3.75 sq mi)
- Elevation: 141 m (463 ft)
- Highest elevation: 269 m (883 ft)
- Lowest elevation: 102 m (335 ft)
- Population (2023): 101
  - Density: 10.4/km^{2} (26.9/sq mi)
- Time zone: UTC+01:00 (CET)
  - Summer (DST): UTC+02:00 (CEST)
- INSEE/Postal code: 61152 /61160
- ^{1} French Land Register data, which excludes lakes, ponds, glaciers > 1 km^{2} (0.386 sq mi or 247 acres) and river estuaries.

Écorches (French pronunciation: [ekɔʁʃ]) is a commune in the Orne department in northwestern France.

== Geography ==
The commune is made up of the following collection of villages and hamlets, Le Hameau Perré, Les Lignerits, Le Moncel and Écorches.

The commune has the River Viette running through it and a single stream the Secqueville.

== Notable buildings and places ==
=== National heritage sites ===
Church of Saint-Saturnin-des-Ligneries a 13th century church classified as a Monument historique in 1948.

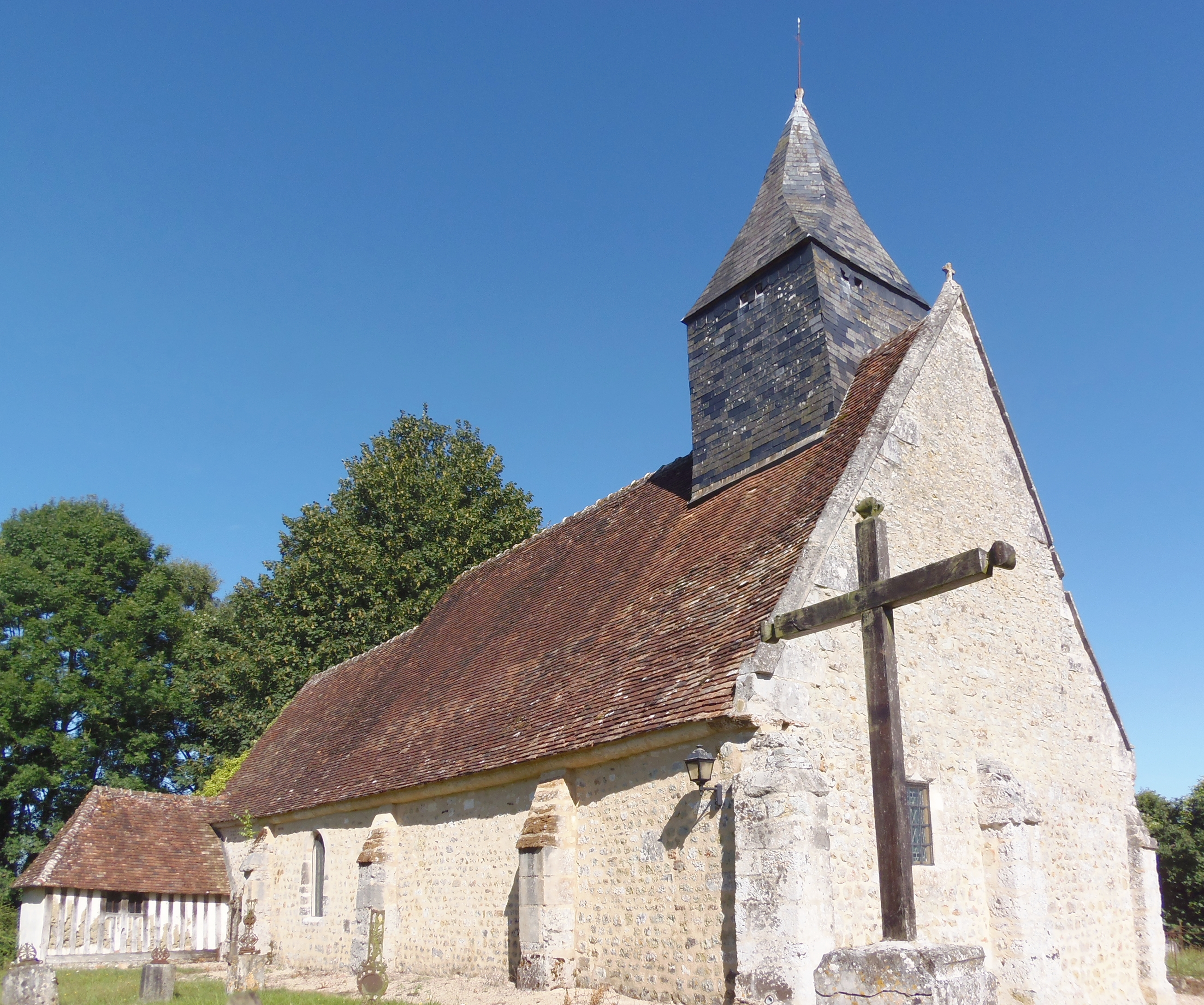
FranceNormandieEcorchesLesLigneritsEglise

== Notable people ==
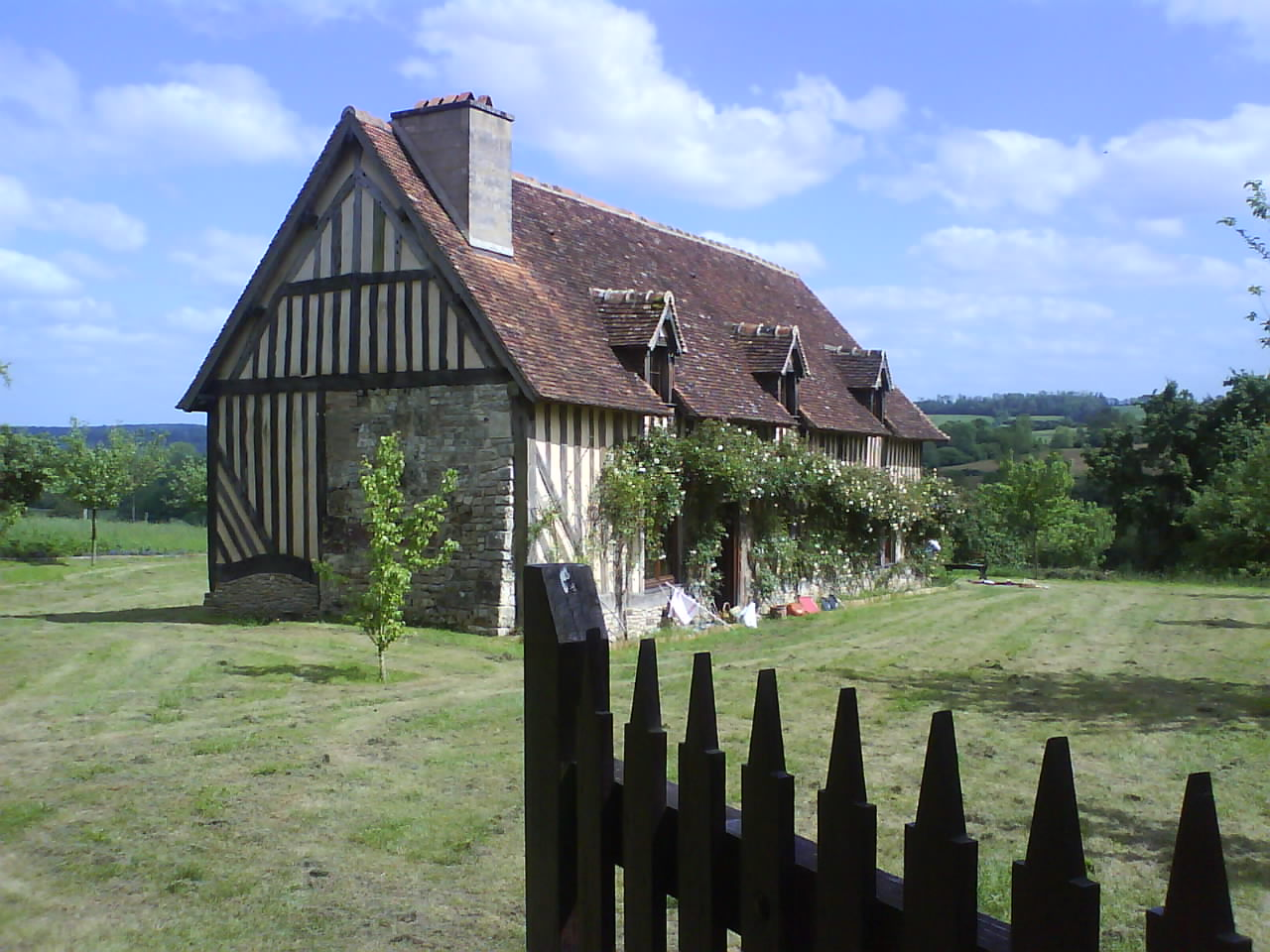
The Corday house

- Gilles de Caux de Montlebert (1682 - 1733) an 18th-century French poet and playwright was born here.
- André Mare (1885 -1932) is buried at the Church of Saint-Saturnin-des-Ligneries.

== See also ==
- Communes of the Orne department
