= Gilles de Caux de Montlebert =

French poet and playwright

- Born: Gilles de Caux de Montlebert; 1682; Ligneries
- Died: 17 September 1733 (aged 50–51); Bayeux
- Known for: Poetry and playwright

Gilles de Caux de Montlebert, (c.1682, Ligneries – 17 September 1733, Bayeux) was an 18th-century French poet and playwright from Normandy.

A descendant of Pierre Corneille by his mother, he was controller of the king's farms. He served as nominees to président Hénault for the publication in 1716 of his tragedy Marius à Cirthe, to which he probably worked. His tragedy Lysimachus, completed by his son, was presented without success in 1737.

Boileau praised one of his poems entitled L'Horloge de sable. He collaborated with L'Année littéraire by Fréron.

== Works ==
- 1714: L'Horloge de sable, figure du monde, moral poem
- 1715: Marius à Cirthe, tragedy, avec le président Hénault, premiered 15 November 1715 (published in 1716)
- 1725: Ode au roi et à la reine sur leur mariage
- 1737: Lysimachus, tragedy, premiered 13 December 1737 (published in 1738)
- Adraste, tragedy (non printed)
