= Dimitrios Galanis =

Former Greek basketball coach

Galanis Dimitrios
Personal information
- Born: 10 December 1971 (age 54)
- Coaching career: 1990–present

Career history
- 1990–1992: Philippos B.C. Junior Team - Assistant coach Men's Team A2 Division
- 1996: Philippos B.C. - Assistant coach in strip club - Head coach - A2 Division
- 1997: A.C. Finikas - Assistant coach C Division
- 1998: A.C. Finikas - Head coach C Division
- 1999: B.C. Nestor - Head coach C Division
- 2000: ICBS B.C. - Assistant coach B Division
- 2001: Ifaistos B.C. - Head coach C Division
- 2002–2004: Keravnos B.C. - Head coach B Division
- 2005: Panorama B.C. - Head coach B Division
- 2006: Iraklis B.C. - Assistant coach - Head coach A1 Division
- 2008: Kavala B.C. - Head coach - B Division
- 2009–2012: Pierikos B.C. - Head coach - A2 Division
- 2013: Kavala B.C. - Head coach - A1 Division
- 2014: Lukoil Academic B.C. - Head coach - Champion of Bulgaria - Eurocup
- 2015: Ermis Lagada B.C. - Technical Director
- 2016: Guest Assistant - Sacramento Kings NBA
- 2017: Consultant and Vice Head Coach of National Greek Team on Wheelchair Basketball
- 2017: Assistant Coach of JUMP10 China Team (World 5 on 5 Tournament with 24 teams)

Dimitrios Galanis (Greek: Δημήτριος Γαλάνης, born December 10, 1971) is a Greek professional basketball coach.

== Coaching career ==
Galanis coaches from his 18 but he became head coach at top level coaching Iraklis B.C. (A1, Top Greek League), Pierikos B.C. (A2, Second Greek League), Kavala B.C. (A1, Top Greek League) and Lukoil Academic (champion of Bulgaria, Eurocup).
