= Émile-Paul Frères =

French publishing house

- Status: Defunct (1982)
- Founded: 1881
- Founder: Albert and Robert Paul
- Defunct: 1982
- Country of origin: France
- Headquarters location: Paris, France
- Publication types: Books

Émile-Paul Frères was a French publishing house, whose origins date back to 1881. 'Frères' is French for 'Brothers'. The brand was created by two brothers, Albert and Robert Paul, the sons of the founder Émile Paul. It was active until 1955, before disappearing in 1982. It was the first publisher of Alain-Fournier's Le Grand Meaulnes.

== Sources ==
- Pascal Fouché, L’Édition française sous l’Occupation 1940-1944, Bibliothèque de littérature française contemporaine de l'université Paris 7, 1987-1988 ; reissue Éditions de l’IMEC, 2 volumes, 2005 ASIN B017CVD0C4.
- « Émile-Paul Frères », by Marie-Gabrielle Slama in P. Fouché et al. (direction) Dictionnaire encyclopédique du livre, Paris, Le Cercle de la librairie, 2005, volume 2, Émile-Paul Frères.
- Jean-Yves Mollier, Édition, presse et pouvoir en France au XX^{e} siècle, Paris, Fayard, 2008 ISBN 9782213638218.
