= André Mare =

French painter and designer

- André Mare, c. 1912
- Born: Charles André Mare; 1885; Argentan, Orne, France
- Died: November 1932 (aged 46–47); Les Lignerits, Orne, France
- Resting place: Écorches
- Other name: André-Charles Mare
- Known for: Painting
- Movement: Cubism and Art Deco
- Elected: French Legion of Honour

Charles André Mare (1885–1932), or André-Charles Mare, was a French painter and textile designer, and co-founder of the Company of French Art (la Compagnie des Arts Français) in 1919. He was a designer of colorful textiles, and was one of the founders of the Art Deco movement.

As a soldier in the French Army in World War I, Mare led the development of military camouflage, painting artillery using Cubism techniques to deceive the eye. His ink and watercolor painting Le canon de 280 camouflé (The Camouflaged 280 Gun) shows the close interplay of abstract art and military application at that time. He authored the book Cubisme et Camouflage, 1914–1918.

Mare sketched and painted scenes based on his experiences in World War I. His works include: American Troops Marching Through the Arch of Triumph, 1930, and The Funeral of Marshal Foch, 1931.

After the war Mare combined his talents with the skills of architect Louis Sue and became a leader in the Art Deco movement. He designed pavilions, textiles and furnishings for the International Exhibition of Modern Decorative and Industrial Arts in Paris in 1925. and interiors of residences and the French ocean liners. A common feature of his work was the stylized rose, in garlands or bouquets.

== Early life ==
Mare was born in Argentan, in Normandy. His childhood friends included the painter Fernand Léger. The young Mare had a passion for drawing, and decided to go to Paris to study art and design. In 1904, he enrolled at the School of Decorative Arts, and also took courses at the Académie Julian. In 1906, he showed his paintings and designs at the Salon des indépendants. In the following years, he participated in the Salon d'Automne, where he showed works along with those of his friends Roger de La Fresnaye, André Dunoyer de Segonzac, Maurice Marinot and Marcel Duchamp. His designs in 1911 included very elaborate and stylized floral patterns for textiles, breaking away from traditional and Art Nouveau models. Guillaume Apollinaire commented on his skill in designing furniture.

At the 1912 Salon d'Automne he and Raymond Duchamp-Villon, Marcel Duchamp, Jean Metzinger, Albert Gleizes, Marie Laurencin, Fernand Léger and Roger de La Fresnaye collaborated in the design of the La Maison Cubiste, an architectural installation designed to display cubist paintings. Mare designed the colorful wallpaper, which featured stylized roses and floral patterns, along with upholstery, furniture and carpets with similar motifs. It was a distinct break from traditional decor, and became a prototype for Art Deco interior design. The installation attracted considerable attention, and some scandal, in the press.

== War and camouflage ==
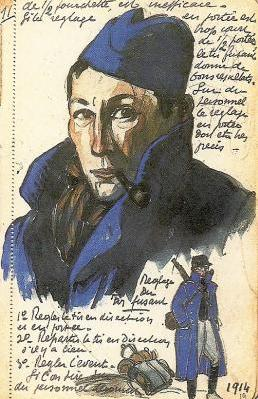
Self-portrait during World War I

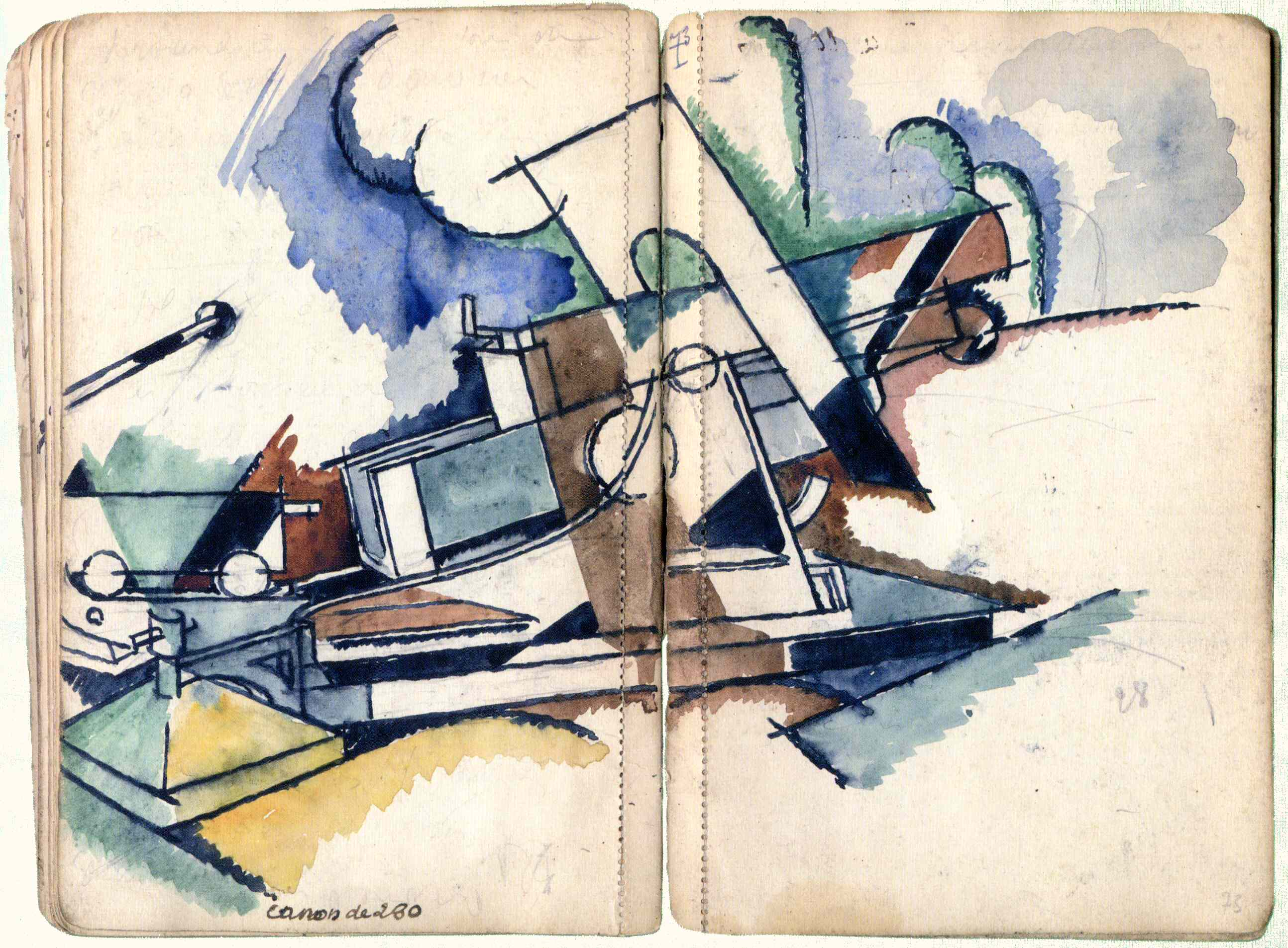
André Mare's ink and watercolour painting Le canon de 280 camouflé (The Camouflaged 280 Gun), c.1917, shows a Cubist artist's work for the French army in World War I.

During the First World War, Mare worked on camouflage for the French army, in a section of camoufleurs created by Lucien-Victor Guirand de Scevola and directed by his friend Dunoyer de Segonzac. He also worked for the British and Italian armies with his friend Fernand Léger and other painters including Forain, Charles Camoin, Charles Dufresne, Villon, and Marcoussis; and with the sculptors Henri Bouchard and Charles Despiau—and with stage designers from the theatre.

Mare applied the principles of disruptive coloration camouflage using forms derived from Cubism: bands of colour juxtaposed to prevent the eye from recognizing the shape of a gun barrel, for example. Colours are chosen to overlap with those of the surrounding landscape. At that time, Mare painted ten of his many watercolour sketchbooks in Cubist style. His sketched designs include hollow camouflaged armoured trees for use as observation posts.

In 1916 Mare was badly wounded by shrapnel from a shell on the front in Picardy while helping to set up an observation post.

On 10 August 1916 Mare was awarded the Military Cross by King George V of the United Kingdom.

== Art Deco ==
At the end of the War, Mare returned quickly to his artistic work. In 1919, he was commissioned, along with Louis Süe and Gustave Louis Jaulmes, to design the decorations for the Champs-Élysées and the Arc-de-Triomphe to celebrate the first Bastille Day after the war. In 1919 he also joined with Louis Süe to create the Compagnie des Arts Française, an interior design firm. He began producing designs for wallpapers, upholstery and other fabrics with his signature designs of baskets and wreaths of roses.

Mare and Süe worked together for eight years, making some fifty different architectural ensembles, including interiors for the French Embassies in Warsaw and Washington, for the house of perfume manufacturer Jean Patou, and the grand salon of the ocean liner Ile-de-France. They were also invited by the composer Maurice Ravel to design sets and costumes for his new ballet, L'Heure Espanol, at the Paris Opera. In 1926, André Mare was made a knight of the French Legion of Honour for his services to the decorative arts.

In 1921, Mare and Süe published a manifesto called Architectures, with illustrations by artists including Paul Vera, Roger de La Fresnaye, Marie Laurencin, and Charles Dufresne, and text by Paul Valéry. They declared that their objective was to create ensembles which were "serious, logical, and welcoming." The Dining Room for Paul Girod (1920–21), (now in the Museum of Decorative Arts in Paris) was typical of the Mare and Süe Art Deco style; it featured exquisite craftsmanship and extremely expensive materials; the walls were covered with rosewood and mahogany, and the lighting fixtures were set in a ceiling decorated with gold leaf. On the upper portion of the walls, Bas-reliefs in gilded stucco by Paul Vera illustrated "Summer" and "Autumn". The room also featured a fountain and faucets with sculptural decoration of gilded bronze.

However, in his later years, his health, damaged by mustard gas during the war, began to fail. In 1927 André Mare decided to leave the Compagnie des Arts Français for health reasons, and instead devoted himself exclusively to painting. In 1930, he painted a large panel: The Funeral of Marshal Foch with landscapes inspired by his native Normandy.

In November 1932, he died of tuberculosis, a result of serious mustard gas poisoning in the war. He is buried in the small cemetery of Lignerits in the Auge.

In October–November 1933, a large body of his works was shown in the 23rd exhibition of the Société Normande de Peinture Moderne in the Musée des Beaux-Arts de Rouen.

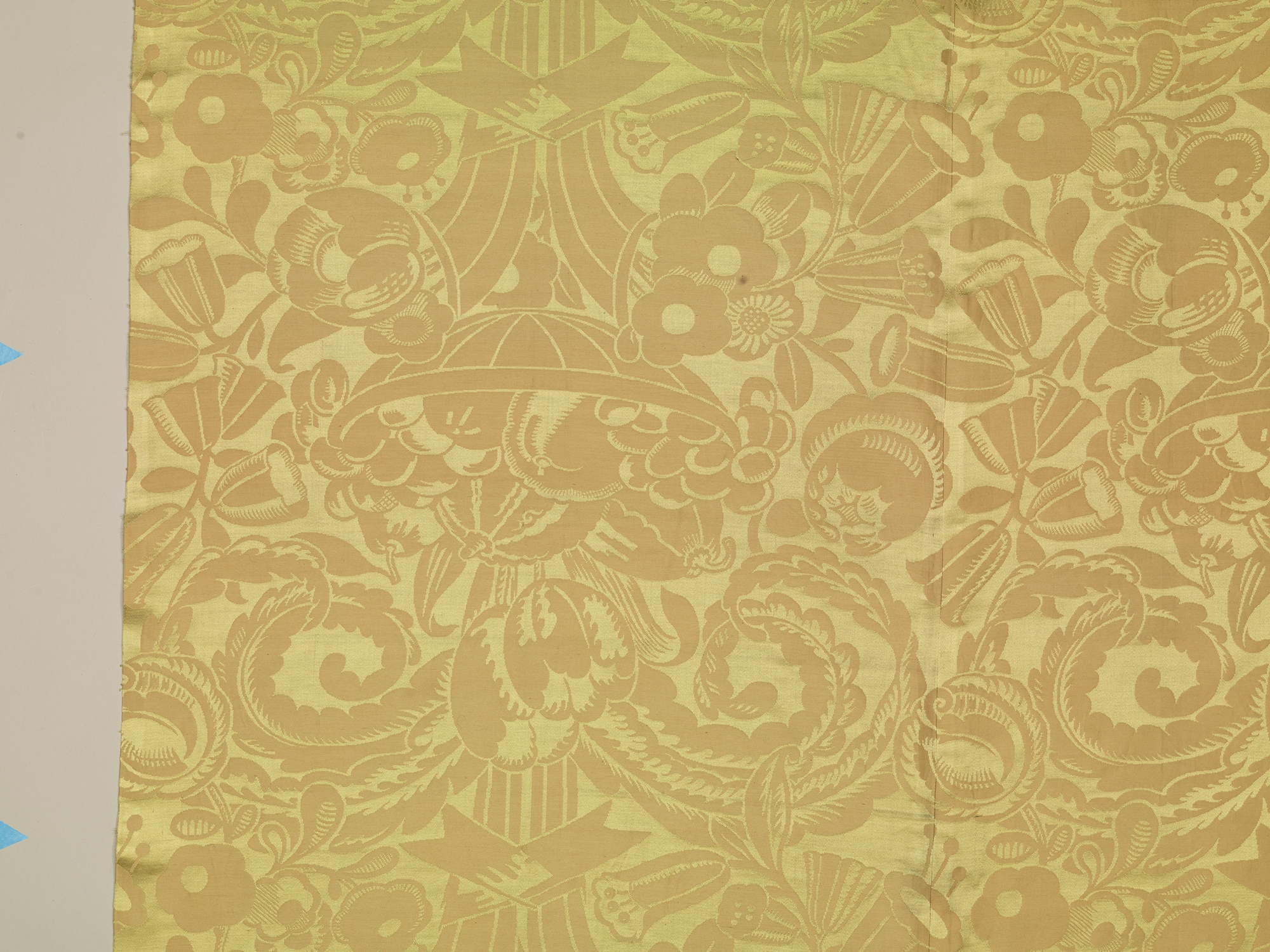
Textile design Abundance by André Mare, (1911), Metropolitan Museum of Art

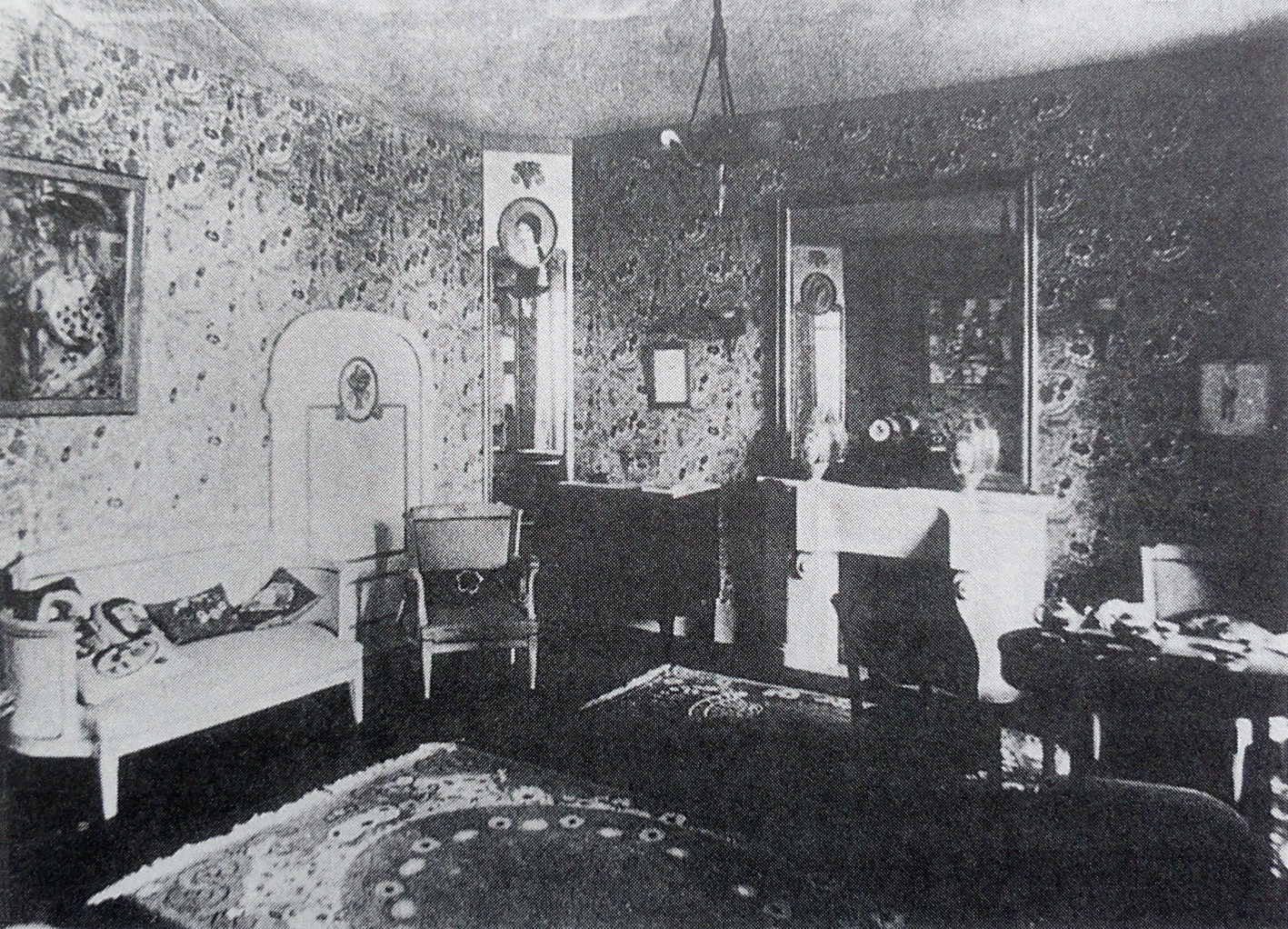
Le Salon Bourgeois, designed by André Mare in La Maison Cubiste in the decorative arts section of the Salon d'Automne, 1912, Paris.

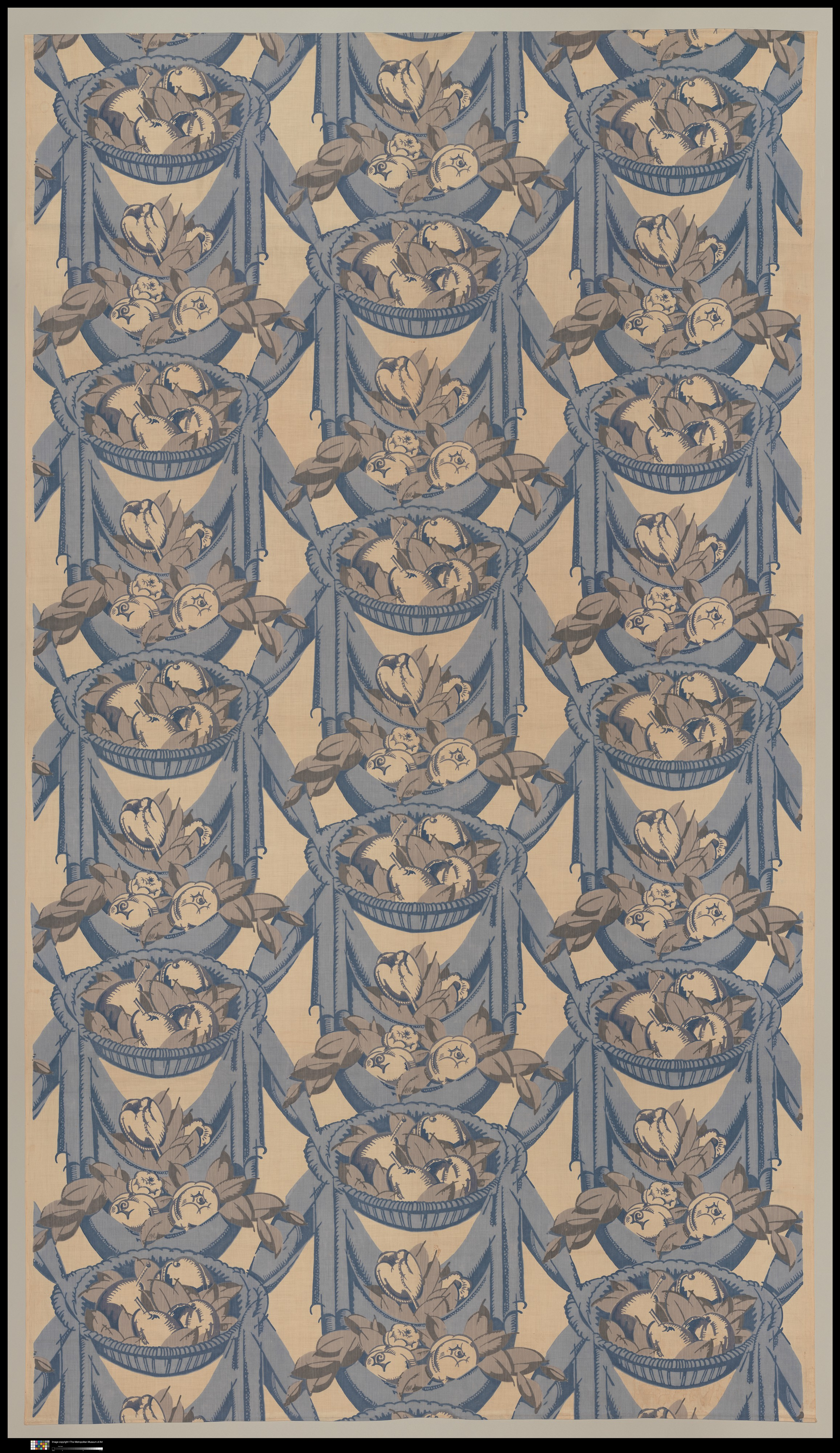
Rose Pattern Textiles designed by Mare (c. 1919), Metropolitan Museum of Art

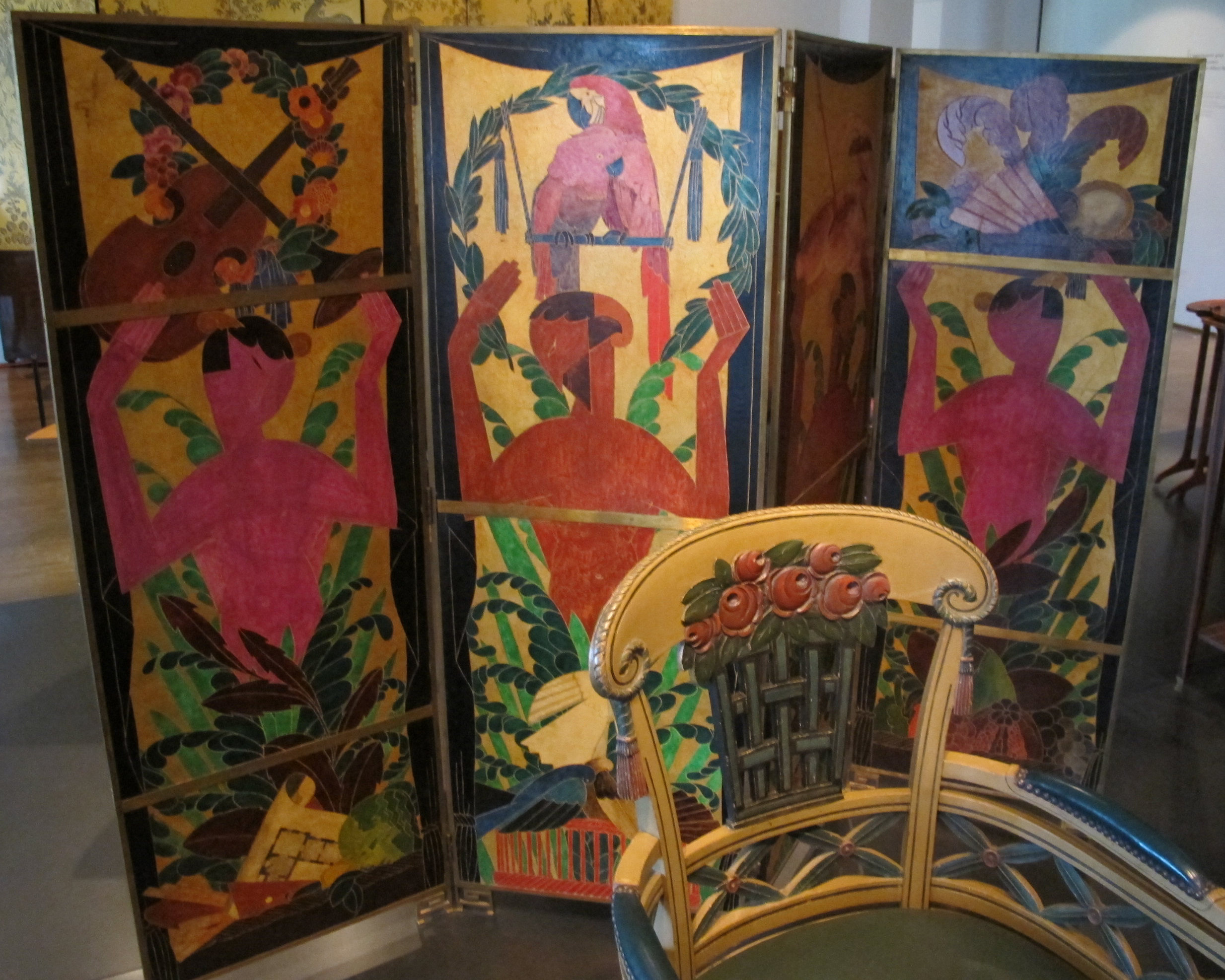
Paravent Les Faunes (c. 1920), Musée des Arts Décoratifs, Paris

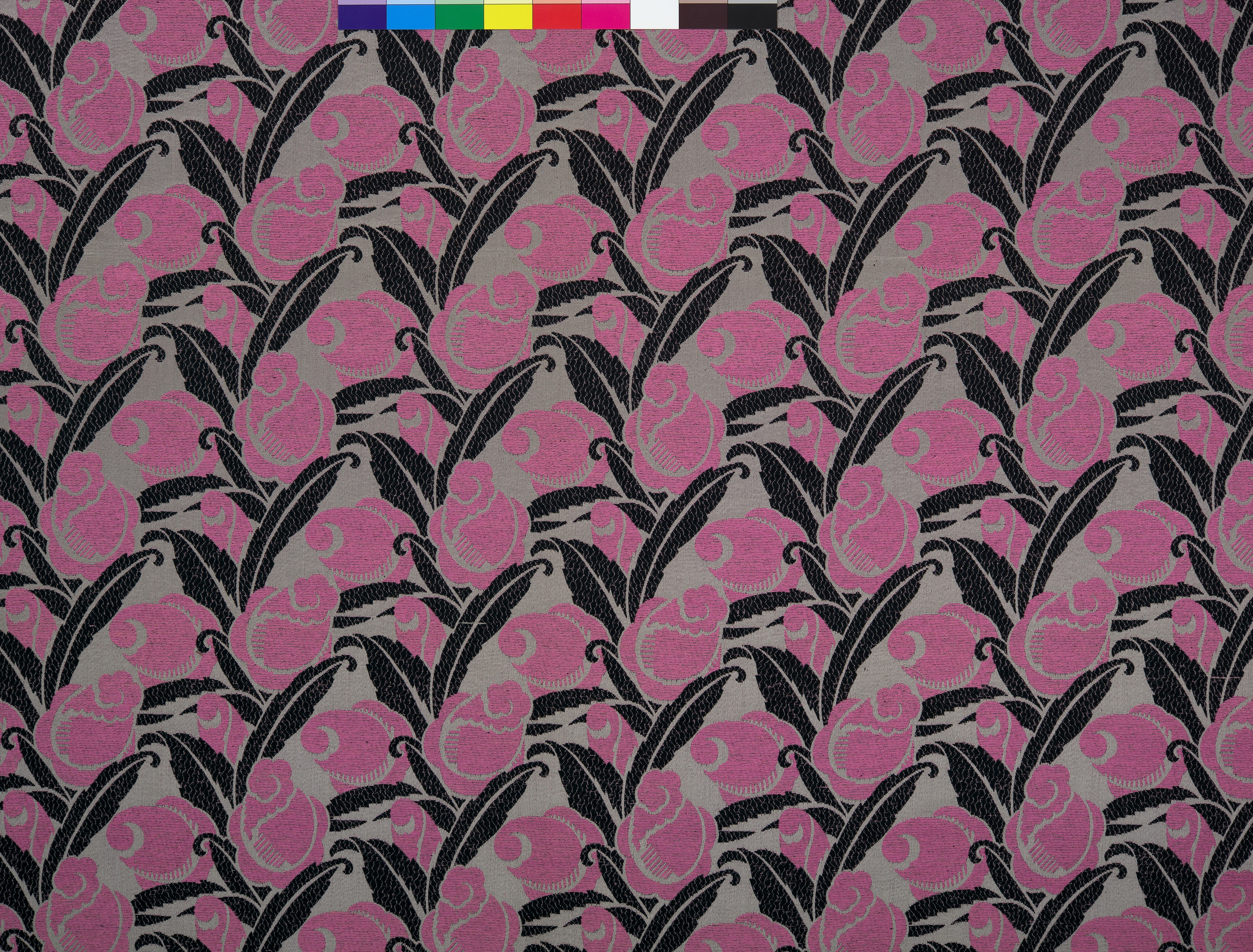
Rose Mousse pattern for upholstery, cotton and silk (1920), Metropolitan Museum of Art

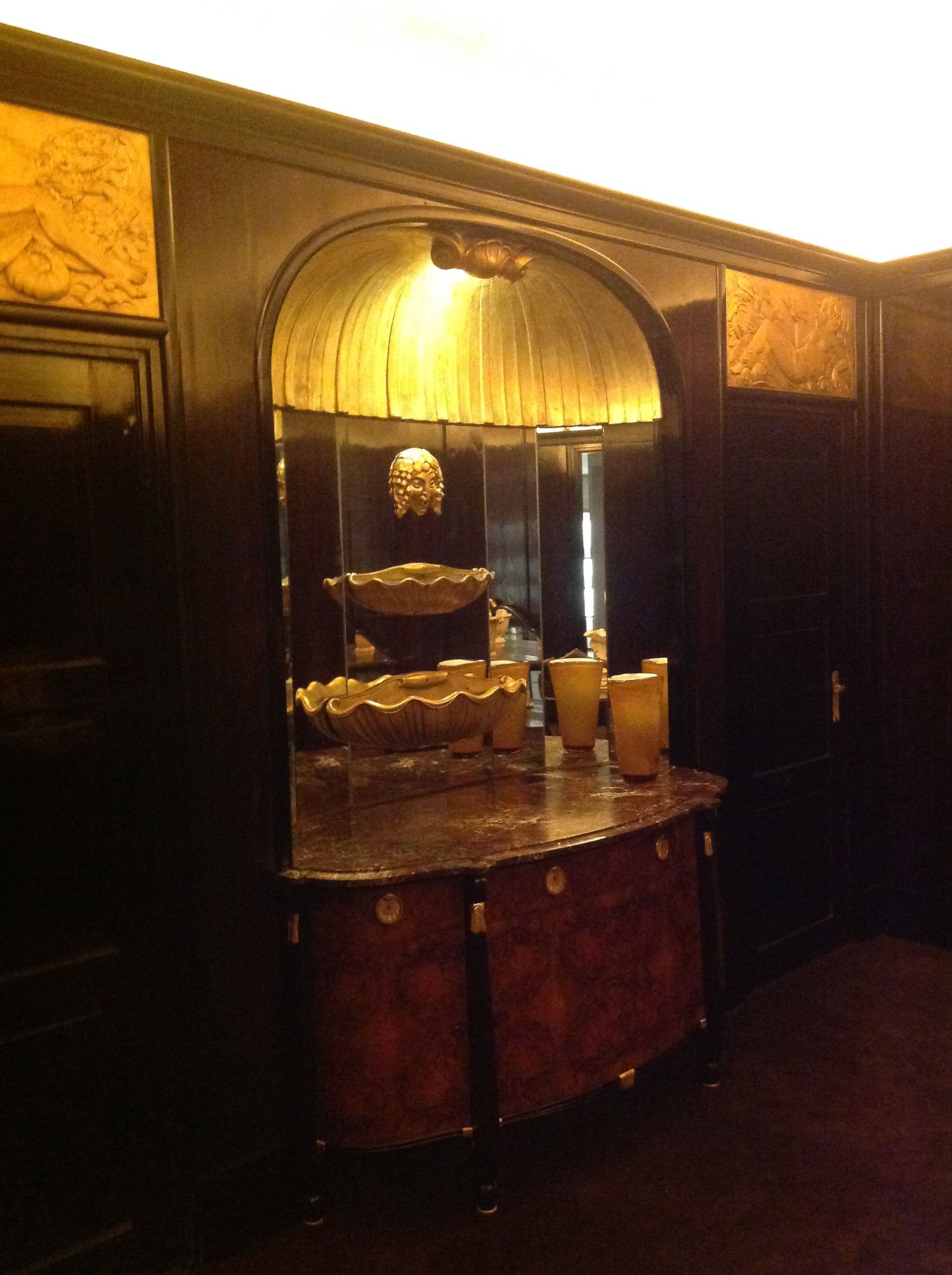
Buffet by Mare and Suë made for Pierre Girod (1920–21), of mahogany, walnut, marble, and gilded bronze

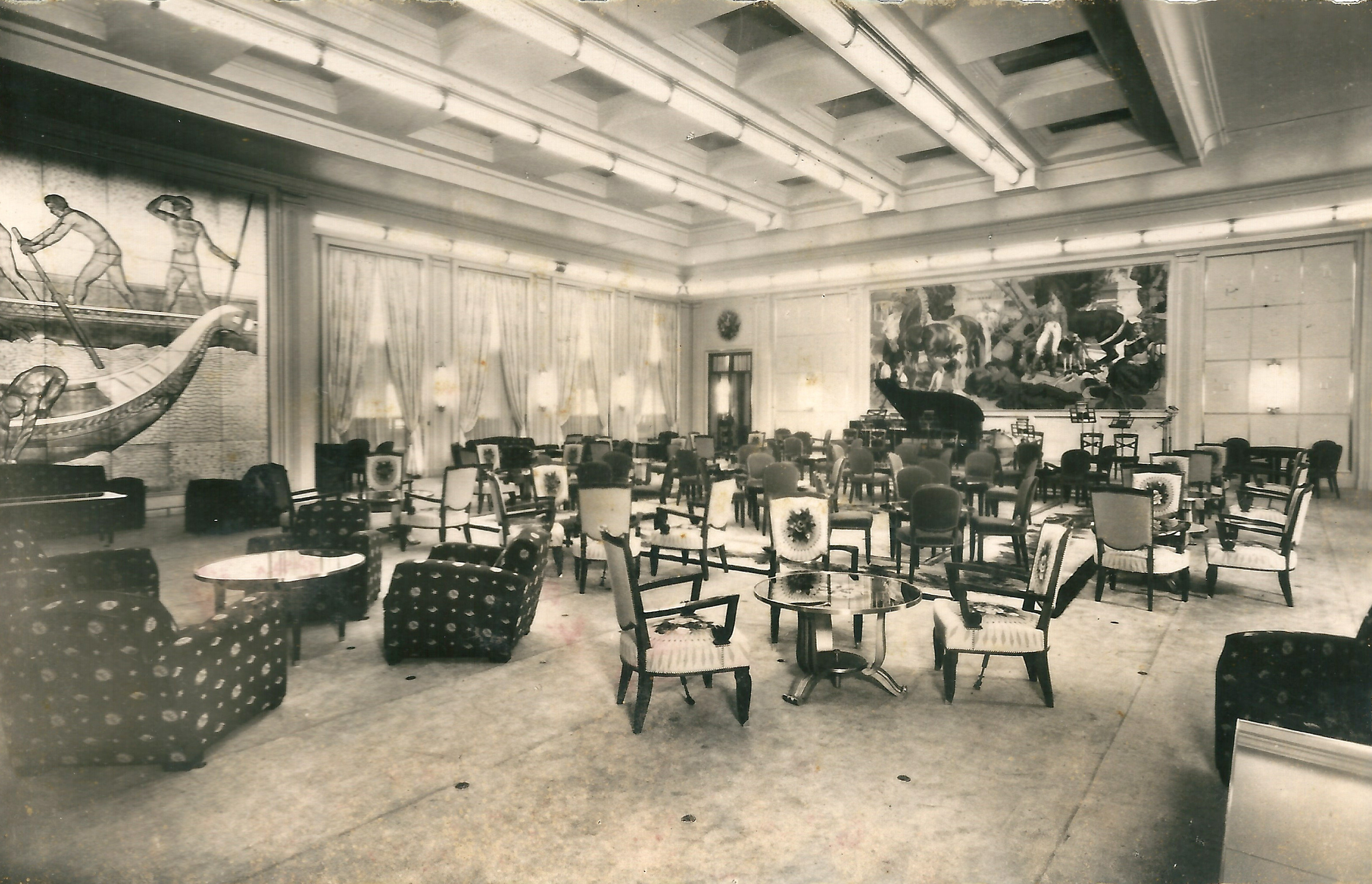
Grand Salon of the SS Île de France (1927)

== Selected works in French museums ==
- La Dactylo (1922), oil on canvas, Musée des beaux-arts de Bernay.
- Intérieur de l'abbatiale à Bernay, oil on canvas, Musée des beaux-arts de Bernay.
- Satan. Esquisse de chevaux dans une écurie (1926), oil on canvas, Musée des beaux-arts de Bernay.
- Le Jockey (1928), oil on canvas, Musée des beaux-arts de Bernay.
- Vue de Caen. Le Port St-Jean et St-Pierre (1931), oil on canvas, Musée des beaux-arts de Bernay.
- Le Haras du Pin (1924), oil on canvas, Musée d'art moderne de Troyes.
- L'Étalon (1928), oil on canvas, Musée d'art moderne de Troyes.
- Carnets de guerre, (1914–1918), watercolour notebooks, Archives nationales (France).
- Salle à manger Art Déco, (1920–1921), furniture, textiles and at the Musée des Arts Décoratifs, Paris.

== Bibliography ==
- Arwas, Victor (1992). Art Deco. Harry N. Abrams Inc. ISBN 0-8109-1926-5.
- Léger, Fernand, Lettres à Charlotte et André Mare (1906–1932), correspondance présentée par Tristan Rondeau et préfacée par Michel Onfray. Textes d’introduction de Laurence Graffin, Jean-Christophe Orticoni, Yves Chevrefils Desbiolles et Benoît Noël, Sainte-Marguerite-des-Loges, Éditions BVR, 2019
- Mare, A. Cubisme et Camouflage, 1914–1918. Musee municipal des Beaux-Arts, Bernay, 1998. ISBN 2910156044 (in French)
- Mare, A. et Sue, L. André Mare et la Compagnie des Arts Français. L'Ancienne Douane, Strasbourg, 1971. (in French)
- Duncan, Alistair, Art déco, Thames and Hudson, London (1988), ISBN 2-87811-003-X (in French)
