= André Groult =

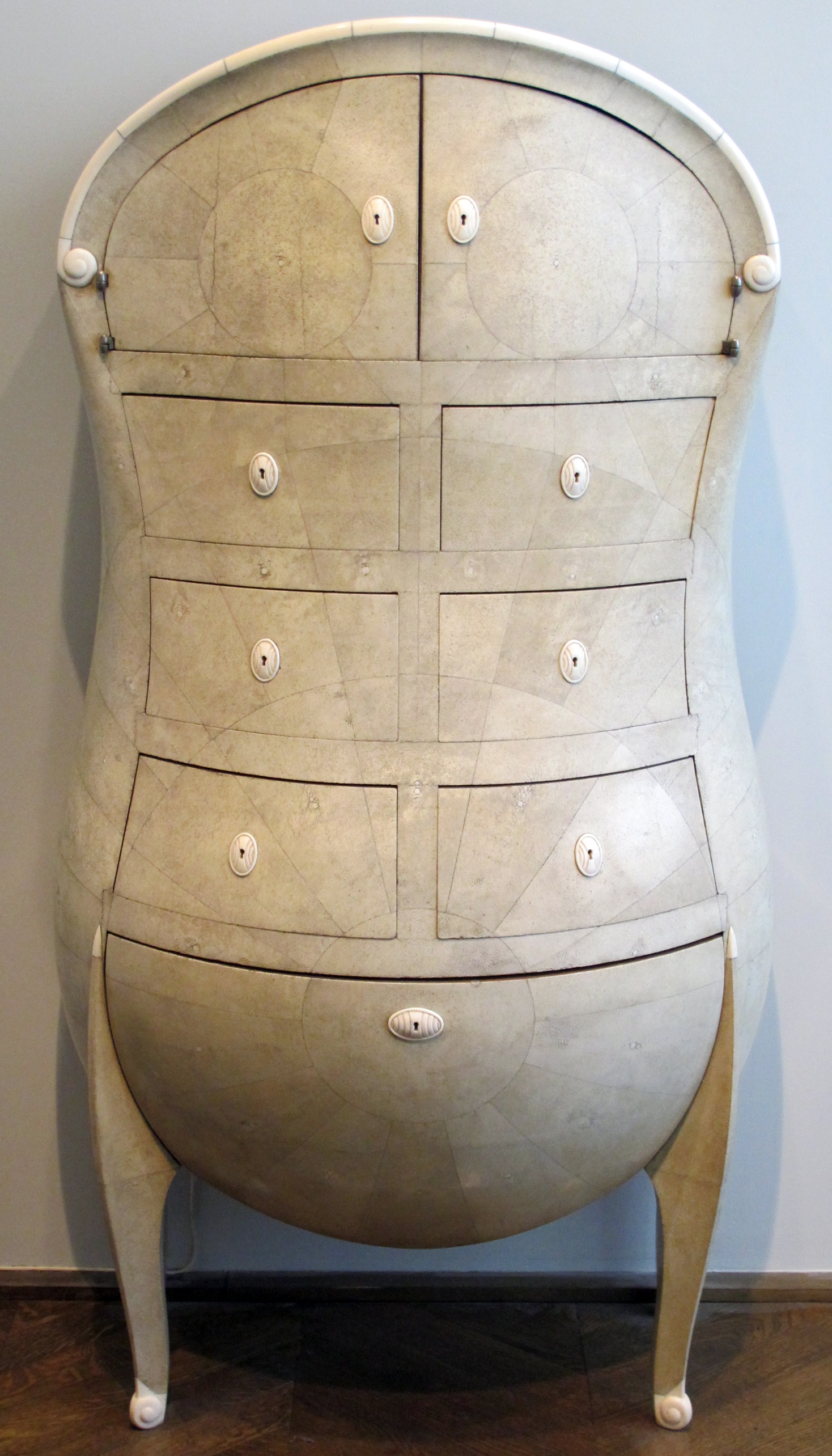
Chiffonnier Antrophomorphe (1925), Musée des Arts Décoratifs, Paris

André Groult (27 August 1884 – 1966) was a French decorator and furniture designer., and one of the most prominent figures of the Art Deco style. His work featured curving and organic shapes, and extremely rich materials. His work has been described as compromising between tradition and modernism. For the Exposition Internationale des Arts Décoratifs et Industriels Modernes in 1925, he designed a woman's bedchamber with a pink and gray palette. The room featured tended walls of Soie stitching. The furniture in the room was rounded and covered in natural Galuchat.

In 1935, Groult designed the furnishings of the first-class cabins on the ocean liner SS Normandie.
