= Wittouck family =

Noble Belgian family

- Blazon: "Argent, three mason's levels sable"
- Parent family: Seven Noble Houses of Brussels
- Country: Austrian Netherlands United Belgian States; French First Republic; First French Empire; United Kingdom of the Netherlands Kingdom of Belgium
- Place of origin: Brussels
- Founded: 18th century
- Members: Guillaume Wittouck, Paul Wittouck
- Estates: château de Petit-Bigard, château de La Fougeraie, château des Bouleaux.

The Wittouck family (/witʊk/) is a noble Belgian family, that descends from the Seven Noble Houses of Brussels, established in Brussels since the 18th century.

This family has distinguished itself in the high magistracy and high industry (distilleries, breeding, sugar refinery).

== Members ==
- Guillaume Wittouck (1749–1829), high magistrate.
- Jeanne Wittouck (1781–1849), wife of Jean-Louis Van Dievoet (1777–1854), Secretary of the Belgian supreme court.
- François Wittouck (1783–1814) husband of Pétronille van Cutsem.
- Félix-Guillaume Wittouck (1812–1898), distiller, burgomaster of Sint-Pieters-Leeuw.
- Félix Wittouck (1849–1916), industrial sugar refiner.
- Paul Wittouck (1851–1917), industrialist.
- Frantz Wittouck (1855–1914), industrialist, husband of Albertine Brandeis. They had:
  - Jean Wittouck,
  - Élisabeth Wittouck, wife of Jules Guillaume, diplomat,
  - Marie-Thérèse Wittouck, wife of Jean Ullens.
- Élisabeth Wittouck, wife of Jules Guillaume, Belgian diplomat.
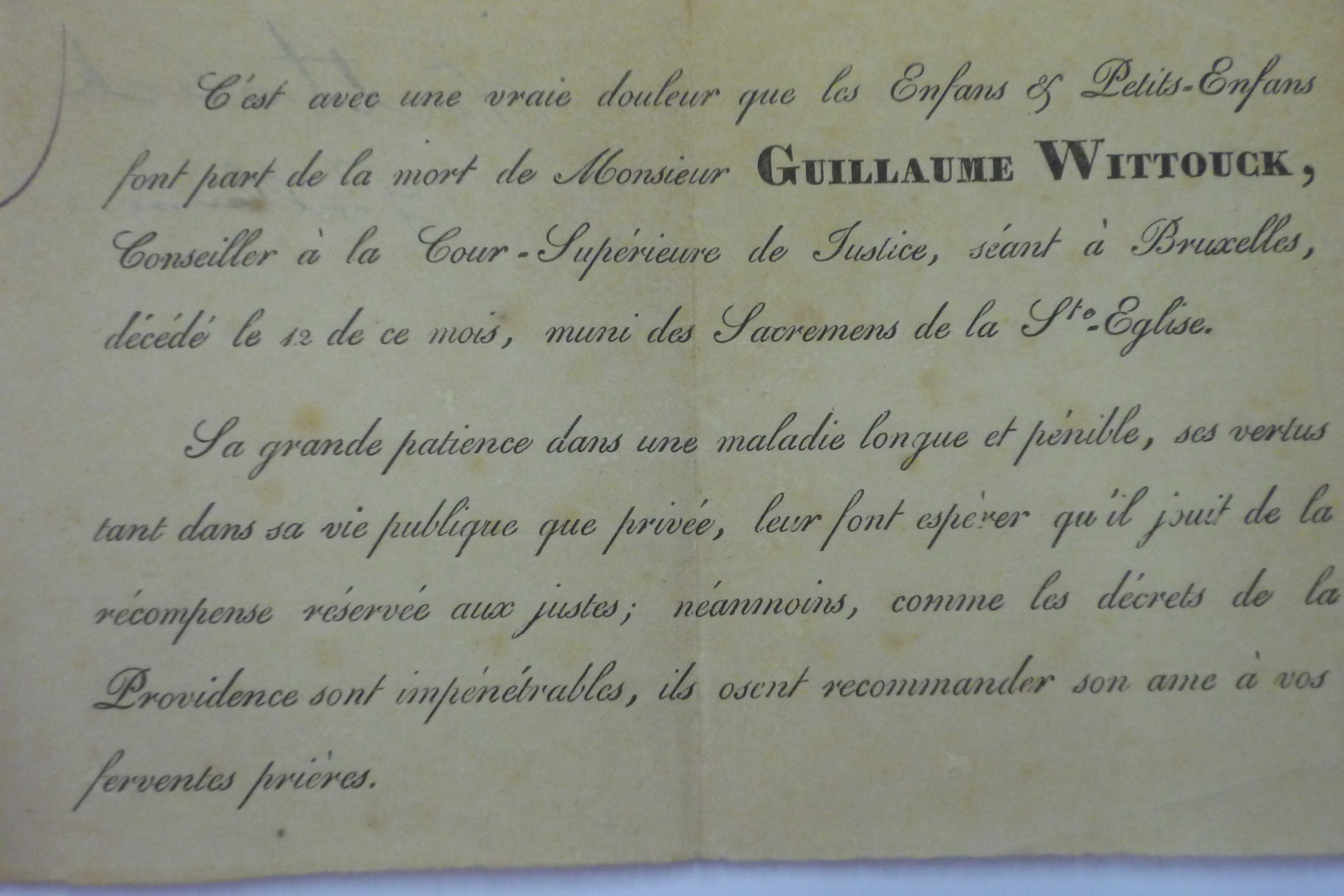
  Announcement of death of Guillaume Wittouck, deceased in Brussels on 12 June 1829.
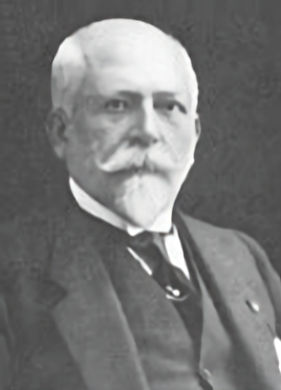
  Paul Wittouck (1851-1917).
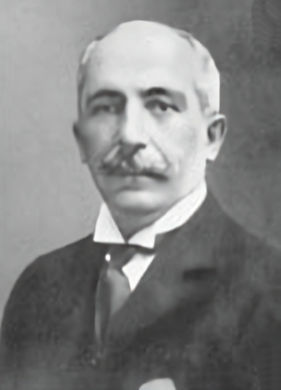
  Frantz Wittouck (1855-1914)
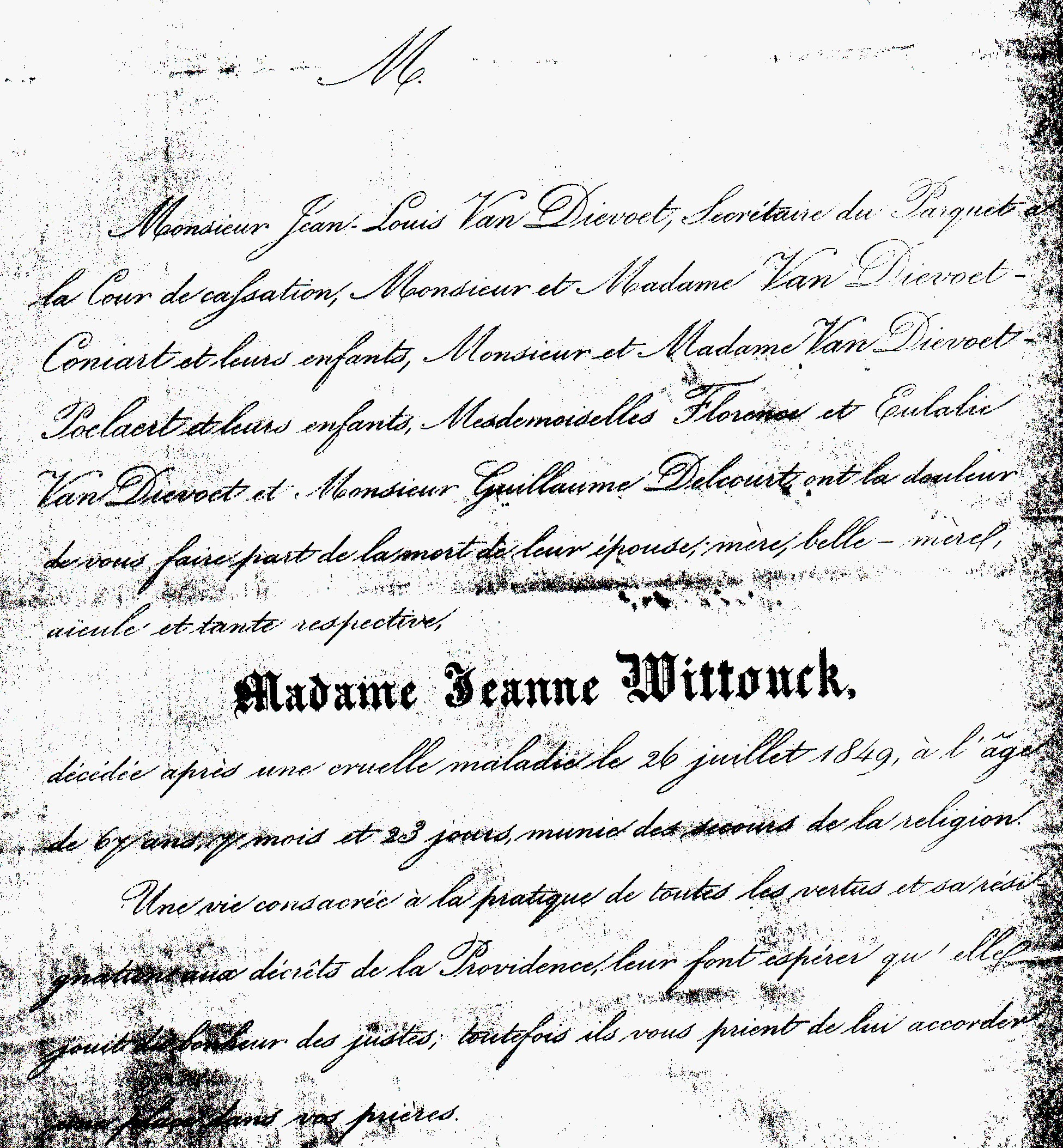
  Announcement of death of Jeanne Wittouck (1781-1849), wife of Jean-Louis Van Dievoet (1777-1854).
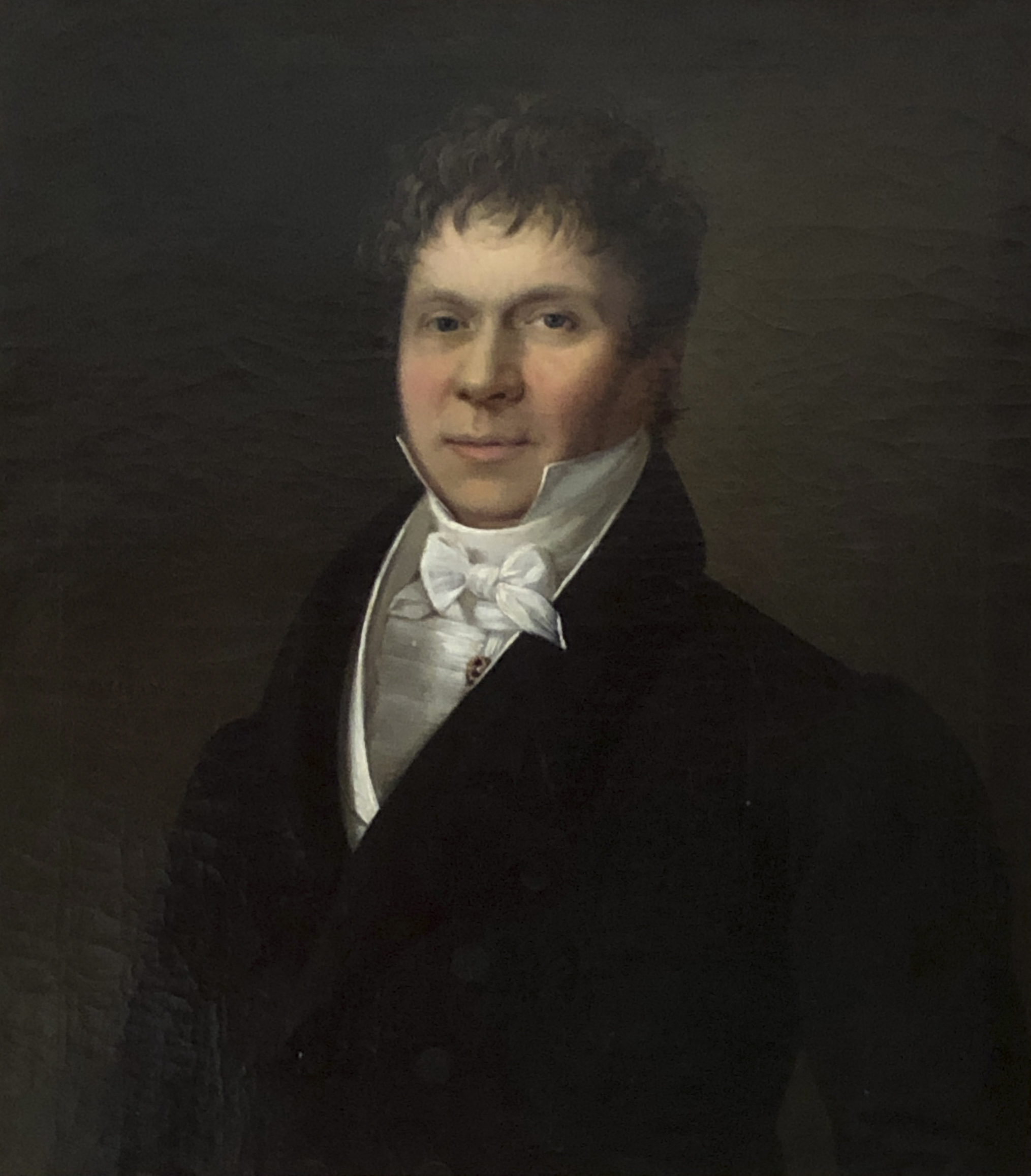
  Jean-Louis van Dievoet (1777-1854), husband of Jeanne Wittouck (1781-1849), portrait by Ignace Brice.
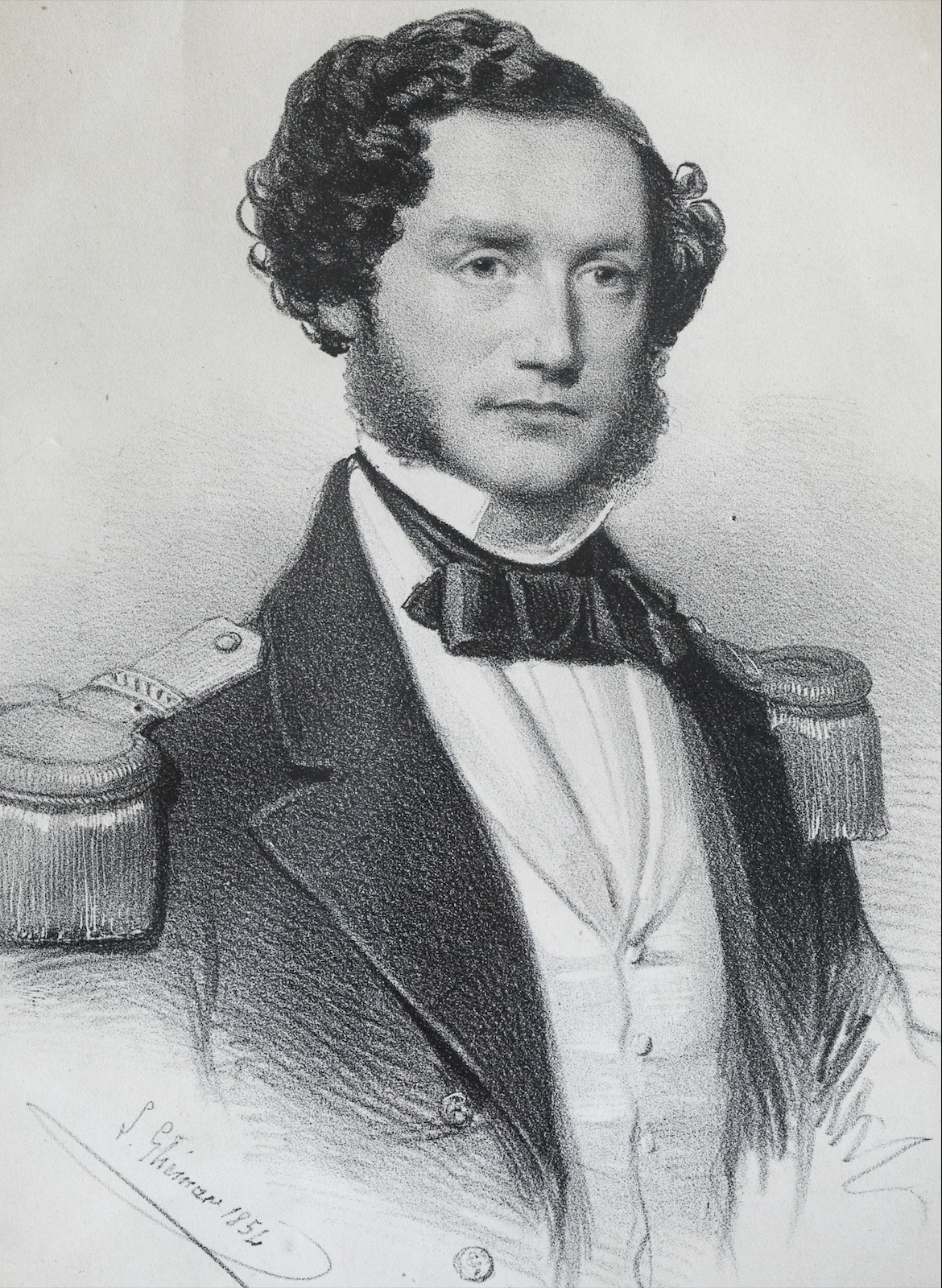
  Guillaume Delcourt, son of Barbara Wittouck.

== The Wittouck family ==
I) Josse (Judocus) Wittouck, administrator ("concierge") of the domain of the Duke of Arenberg at Drogenbos, baptised on 29 January 1710 in Saint-Nicolas (Waas), died probably in 1785 in Uccle, married in Drogenbos on 1 December 1745 (witnesses: Franciscus van Haelen and Anthonius de Ruyst), Maria Anna van Haelen, baptized in Uccle on 8 February 1721, died in Drogenbos on 23 April 1796, daughter of François van Haelen and Marie Anne Vandiest. The couple Wittouck-van Haelen had eight children.

On 26 May 1751 the couple Josse Wittouck-van Haelen bought to Louis-Engelbert, Duke of Arenberg a parcel of land at the place called "Horeken", in the bend of the Senne where are now established the Papeteries Catala-Ondulium.

1) Maria Anna Wittouck, baptised in Drogenbos on 25 October 1746.
2) François Wittouck, on 3 March 1748.
3) Guillaume Wittouck, 30 October 1749, which follows under II. Issue of Guillaume Wittouck, Counselor at the Supreme Court of Brabant.
4) François Wittouck, on 1 December 1751.
5) Jacques Wittouck, made bourgeois of Brussels on 27 May 1794, succeeded his father in the service of Arenberg, miller, cost (sacristan) of Drogenbos (1785), drossard of Beersel from 1792 to 1794, municipal agent (9 germinal year IV) (29 March 1796), born in Drogenbos 26 May 1755, died about 1800, married in Uccle on 17 September 1782 Petronilla van der Meulen, daughter of Josse van der Meulen, brewer in Stalle, and Marie Everaerts. Jacques Wittouck had succeeded Jean-Jacques Cattoir, who had been named drossard, i.e. burgomasterof Beersel, at the appointment of the Duke of Aremberg and Arschot, lord of the place, in 1771. Their descendants include:
a) Isabelle Françoise Victoire Wittouck, born on 21 July 1787, who married in Zellik on 5 October 1808, Pierre Bols, decorated with the Iron Cross, bookbinder, printer-typographer, papermaker, printer of the City of Brussels, known under the printing name "Bols-Wittouck", born in Brussels on 8 September 1789, son of Servais Bols, beer salesman, and Anne Marie Schats, born in Diest.
b) Anne-Philippine Wittouck wife of Antoine Herinckx born 8 January 1776, ancestor of Jean Herinckx, burgomaster of Uccle.
6) Maria Magdalena Wittouck, on 25 January 1759.
7) Judoca Wittouck, born on 24 December 1760.
8) Isabelle Wittouck, married in brussels, Louis Victor Dammeville, burgomaster of Drogenbos, born in Falaise (Calvados).

== Issue of Guillaume Wittouck, Counselor at the Supreme Court of Brabant ==
II. Guillaume Wittouck, born in Drogenbos on 30 October 1749 and died in Brussels on 12 June 1829, lawyer at the Brabant Council, became Counselor at the Supreme Court of Brabant in 1791. During the Brabant Revolution, he sided with the Vonckists, who were in favor of new ideas. When Belgium joined France, he became substitute for the commissioner of the Directory at the Civil Court of the Department of the Dyle, then under the consulate, in 1800, judge at the Brussels Court of Appeal, then from 1804 to 1814, under the Empire, counselor at the Court of Appeal of Brussels, then advisor to the Superior Court of Brussels. He married in Brussels (Church of Saint Nicolas) on 29 June 1778, Anne Marie Cools, born in Gooik on 25 January 1754, died in Brussels on 11 April 1824, daughter of Jean Cools and Adrienne Galmaert descendants of the Seven Noble Houses of Brussels.

Guillaume Wittouck acquired on 28th Floreal of the year VIII (18 May 1800) the castle of Petit-Bigard in Leeuw-Saint-Pierre with a field of one hundred hectares. Petit-Bigard will remain the home of the elder branch until its sale in 1941. Issue:

A) Jeanne Wittouck, née le 3 décembre 1781 à Bruxelles, décédée du choléra le 26 juillet 1849 à Bruxelles, épousa à Leeuw-Saint-Pierre le 7 février 1803, Jean-Louis van Dievoet, Secretary of the Belgian Supreme Courtson of Jean-Baptiste et d’Anne Marie Lambrechts, born in Brussels on 24 November 1777 and died in Brussels on 16 May 1854. They are the parents of the jurisconsult and law historian Augustus Van Dievoet, and they count amongst others among their descendants: Jules Van Dievoet, lawyer at the Court of Cassation, Henri Van Dievoet, architect, Gabriel Van Dievoet, Art Nouveau decorator, Germaine Van Dievoet, swimming champion.

B) François Wittouck, merchant, distiller and burgomaster of Leeuw-Saint-Pierre, born in Brussels on 22 August 1783, died 24 March 1814, after being savagely beaten with knout by the Russian Cossacks who occupied the area of Petit-Bigard. He married in Saintes (department of Dyle) on 19 September 1811, Pétronille Van Cutsem, born in Saintes on 22 May 1791, daughter of François Van Cutsem, born in Leeuw-Saint-Pierre, member of the electoral college of the department of Dyle, owner and farmer in Saintes (Brabant) (brother of Guillaume van Cutsem (1749–1825), jurisconsult and deputy of the department of Deux-Nèthes) and Philippine Josèphe De Pauw, born in Saintes. Pétronille Van Cutsem, widow of François Wittouck, married in second marriage at Leeuw-Saint-Pierre on 20 August 1828, François-Joseph Dindal, lawyer, vice-president of the Senate from 1848 to 1851, born in Brussels, bapt. in Sainte-Gudule on 5 August 1791 and died in Ixelles on 25 May 1866, son of Nicolas Joseph Dindal, surgeon, professor of external clinic, and deliveries at the medical school, member of the Society of Medicine of Brussels, born in Wavre (died 4 August 1826 in Brussels) and Elisabeth-Josèphe Snoeck (died 5 November 1821 in Brussels).

François Wittouck and Pétronille van Cutsem had :

1) Félix-Guillaume Wittouck born in Leeuw-Saint-Pierre on 16 October 1812 and died in Ixelles on 25 May 1898, distiller, burgomaster of Leeuw-Saint-Pierre, he had the family castle of Petit-Bigard enlarged by the architect Henri Beyaert, married Élise Boucquéau, daughter of Grégoire Boucquéau and Clotilde Dervaux. Issue:

a) Félix Wittouck, born in Leeuw-Saint-Pierre on 22 September 1849, where he died on 9 May 1916, industrial sugar refiner, burgomaster of Leeuw-Saint-Pierre living there to the castle of Petit-Bigard, married Sophie Drugman, died in Vyle-et-Tharoul on 1 September 1922, daughter of Jules Drugman. Issue:

1) Félix-René Wittouck, born in Leeuw-Saint-Pierre, on 23 September 1879, died in Biarritz on 31 January 1914.

2) Jacques Wittouck (1882– 1987), reserve lieutenant of the fortress artillery, administrator of the Sugar refinery of Pontelongo (1910–1948) and the silk factory of Tubize, vice-president (1946–1948) of the Forges de Clabecq, Commissioner of the Bank of Hainaut (1915–1934), Belgian Consul in Monte Carlo. The last surviving son of the elder branch, he sold on 14 November 1941, the family castle of Petit-Bigard to the Fathers of Scheut.

3) Marthe Wittouck, born in Leeuw-Saint-Pierre on 21 October 1883, died in Villefort, Yzernay on 31 May 1950, married in Leeuw-Saint-Pierre on 2 December 1909 Viscount François de Chabot, He was born in Villefort Yzernay on 23 October 1876 and died there on 20 August 1959, son of Viscount Raymond de Chabot and Jeanne Victurienne of Colbert-Maulévrier.

4) Tina (Valentina) Wittouck (1877–1933), married in 1898, Paul Lechat (1871–1944), engineer in Liège.

5) Georges Wittouck, lieutenant in the 1st regiment of guides, born on 11 July 1887, died for the fatherland in Merendree on 13 October 1914 at 27 years old.

b) Marguerite Wittouck (passed away in 1927), who married the banker Victor Allard(1840–1912): their daughter Marthe Allard married Robert de Lesseps (1882–1916), pioneer of aviation, son of the famous Ferdinand de Lesseps, creator of the Suez Canal and Panama. They had issue.

c) Paul Wittouck, born in Leeuw-Saint-Pierre on 6 August 1851, died 9 November 1917, in Uccle at the castle of La Fougeraie he had built in 1911 by the architect Louis Süe (1875–1968), married Catherine Baroness de Medem . Issue:

1) Paul (Pavlick) Wittouck, born in Brussels on 26 September 1899, died in Brussels on 8 November 1984.

2) Michel Wittouck, écuyer, knighted on 11 April 1960, born 1 January 1902, husband of Helen Princess Sherbatow. They both distinguish themselves in the Resistance under occupation. Issue:

a) Éric Wittouck, écuyer, licensed in economic sciences, born in Uccle on 5 October 1946.

3) Serge Wittouck, born on 19 August 1903, dead in Manila in July 1940.

d) Frantz Wittouck, born in Leeuw-Saint-Pierre on 30 March 1855, died in Ixelles on 13 June 1914, director of the Sugar refinery of Breda and Berg-op-Zoom, president of the Central Sweets of Wanze, husband of Albertine Brandeis. Monsieur and Madame Frantz Wittouck had the Villa des Bouleaux, or Villa Wittouck, built at Quatre-Bras, near Tervueren by architect Octave Flanneau. Issue:

1) Jean Wittouck, President of the Sugar refinery of Tienen, born in Brussels on 24 April 1901, died in Crans-sur-Sierre (Switzerland) on 13 June 1984, husband of Marguerite Benoist d'Azy. Issue:

a) François Wittouck.

b) Éliane Wittouck (1925–2004), married Robert Rolin Jacquemyns (1918–1980)

b) Béatrice Wittouck, born on 9 October 1929, married Lawrence K. Lunt (1923-2016).

2) Élisabeth Wittouck (1903–1978), Married Baron Jules Guillaume, Ambassador of the King of the Belgians (1892–1962).

3) Marie-Thérèse Wittouck (1905–1989), married Jean Ullens de Schooten Whettnall (1897–1950) .

e) Émilie-Marguerite Wittouck, born in Sint-Pieters-Leeuw on 21 June 1863, died in Brussels on 4 January 1955, married in Brussels on 24 September 1902, Fernand de Beeckman (1845–1918), painter.

2) Adèle Wittouck born a posthumous in Sint-Pieters-Leeuw on 1 June 1814 and died in Ixelles on 20 December 1883, married on 16 May 1833 in Leeuw-Saint-Pierre, François Xavier Rittweger, born in Brussels on 4 July 1801 and died there 24 February 1887, son of François and Anne-Catherine Sauvage. He was domiciled in Brussels, rue de la Fiancée 24. They are the ancestors of the actress Stephanie Crayencour, whose real name Stéphanie Rittweger de Moor.

C) Barbara Wittouck, born in Brussels on 6 June 1796, died in Brussels on 17 June 1830, married in Brussels on 9 July 1823 (act 429), Napoleon Joseph Delcourt, born in Ath, on 12 December 1804, brewer, was wounded during the fighting of the Belgian independence of 1830, died in Antwerp on 30 June 1833, son of Isidore Joseph Delcourt, brewer at Ath, and Marie Louise Jouret. Issue :

1) Guillaume Louis Delcourt, Navy Officer, Grand Navigator and Maritime Advisor to King Leopold II, born in Brussels on 31 March 1825 and died in Antwerp on 2 February 1898, who married in Hoboken on 2 May 1868, Laurence Hortense Joséphine Lambrechts, born in Hoboken on 18 June 1832, daughter of Pierre Joseph Lambrechts, doctor and burgomaster of Hoboken, and of Rosalie Therese Joséphine van de Raey who died in Hoboken on 13 October 1860.

== Alliances ==
- Allard
- de Beeckman
- Benoist d'Azy
- Boucquéau
- Bols
- Brandeis
- de Chabot
- Cools
- van Cutsem
- Dammeville
- Delcourt
- van Dievoet
- Drugman
- Guillaume
- van Haelen
- Herinckx
- Lechat
- von Medem
- van der Meulen
- Sherbatow
- Ullens de Schooten Whettnall
- Rittweger
- Rolin Jacquemyns

== See also ==
- Château de La Fougeraie
- Sugar refinery of Tienen
- List of noble families in Belgium
- Guy Ullens
- Van Dievoet family
- Pipenpoy family
- Belgian Resistance
- Bourgeois of Brussels
- Seven Noble Houses of Brussels

== Bibliography ==
- Sophie De Schaepdrijver et Tammy M. Proctor, An English Governess in the Great War : The Secret Brussels Diary of Mary Thorp, Oxford : University Press, 2017 (contains many passages concerning the Wittouck family where Mary Thorp was governess).
- Sophie De Schaepdrijver, « A World War Seen From A "Side-Show": an Englishwoman's secret Brussels diary », in : Cahiers Bruxellois – Brusselse Cahiers, 2017/1 (XLIX), p. 117-129 (Read online).
- État présent de la noblesse du royaume de Belgique, sub verbo, Wittouck.
- Philippe Farcy, 100 châteaux de Belgique connus et méconnus, Brussels, 2003, volume 2, pp. 76–77.
- Paul Herinckx, Jean Herinckx mon père – 1888–1961, Brussels, éd. Racine, 2002 (préface de Pierre Harmel), p. 18.
- comte Stanislas Rostworoski, Éric Wittouck et son ascendance, Bibliothèque de l'Office Généalogique et Héraldique de Belgique, fonds de Walque, coté L25F.
- Baron de Ryckman de Betz et vicomte Fernand de Jonghe d'Ardoye, "Armorial et Biographies des chanceliers et conseillers de Brabant", recueil 4 des Tablettes du Brabant, Hombeek, 19..
- Victor Martin-Schmets, Paul Claudel et la Belgique, 1981, p. 314.
- Éric Meuwissen, Richesse oblige. La Belle Époque des Grandes Fortunes, (préface de Jean Stengers), Brussels : éditions Racine, 1999, pp. 232, 240, 243, 349.
- Peter Pennoyer et Anne Walker, The architecture of Delano and Aldrich, 2003.
- Marcus Wunderlee, « Wittouck Famille » : in : Dictionnaire des patrons en Belgique, edited by Ginette Kurgan-van Henterijk et alii, Brussels, 1996, pp. 670–672.

== Authority ==
Content in this edit is translated from the existing French Wikipedia article at fr:Famille Wittouck; see its history for attribution.
