= Raffinerie Tirlemontoise =

Belgian sugar producing company

Raffinerie Tirlemontoise / Tiense Suikerraffinaderij
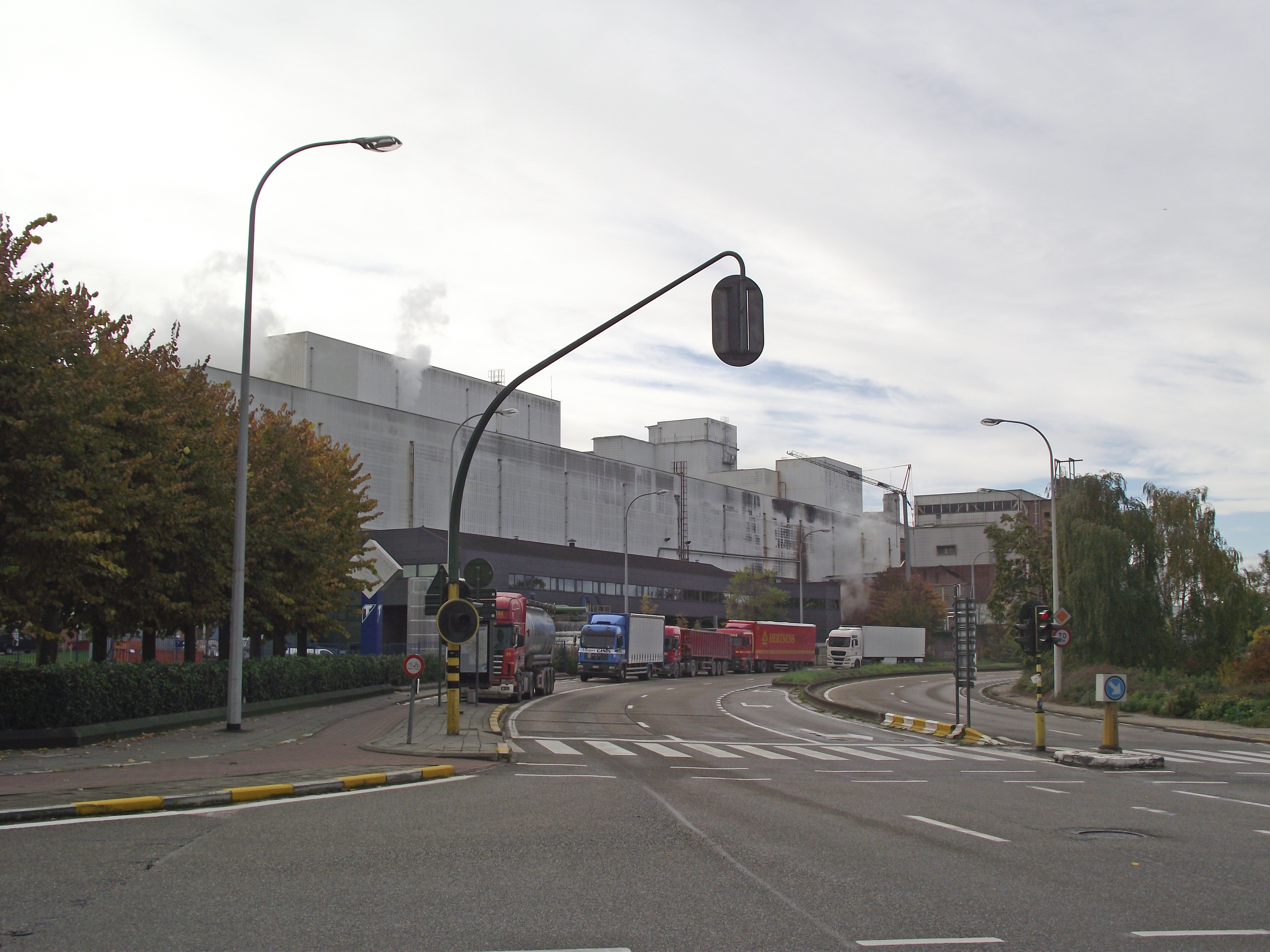
- Raffinerie Tirlemontoise's sugar factory in Tienen
- Industry: White sugar production
- Founded: 1836
- Headquarters: Tienen, Belgium
- Products: White sugar
- Website: www.tiensesuikerraffinaderij.com

Raffinerie Tirlemontoise (Dutch: Tiense Suikerraffinaderij), a subsidiary of Raffinerie Tirlemontoise Group (RT Group), is a Belgian sugar producing company. The company whose headquarters is located in Tienen, Belgium, has four business units: sugar activities, Orafti, Surafti and PPE, which together employ more than 1,800 people.

== Structure ==
=== Locations ===
The company Raffinerie Tirlemontoise operates two beet sugar factories in Belgium: The factory in Tienen has a capacity of 12,500 tons of beets per day, Wanze Sugar Factory can process 16,500 tons of beets per day. The latter is fed beet juice by the Râperie de Longchamps, the last operational râperie in the world. Sugar specialties are produced in Antwerp (Candico), in Oostkamp (Lebbe Sugar Specialties), and in Wijchen, the Netherlands (Rafti B.V.).

=== No sugar refinery ===
Judging by the name 'Raffinerie Tirlemontoise', one would expect that the company also operates a sugar refinery, but that is not the case. When the name Raffinerie Tirlemontoise was given to the company in 1887, it was rare for beet sugar factories to refine their own product to a quality comparable to a sugar refiner's work. In 1878 the company was named in a list of only 12 Belgian sugar refiners. The same work listed over 150 sugar factories. So at the time, the Vinckenbosch company was really considered to own a refinery. At the time, the factory was even mentioned explicitly as a factory with refinery.

In the 20th century, almost every sugar factory began to refine its own product. Giving a different name to a sugar factory that also refined then became useless. However, the company name Raffinerie Tirlemontoise has not changed. Like the company itself, the current owner of the company, Südzucker, consistently refers to the company Raffinerie Tirlemontoise and its two sugar factories.

== History ==
=== Context ===
Coat of arms of the Wittouck family

The sugar beet industry in Europe and Belgium has its roots in the Continental System of Napoleon I in his struggle against the United Kingdom of Great Britain and Ireland during the Napoleonic Wars. Sugar from sugar beets was increasingly used as an alternative for sugarcane, when in 1807 the British began a blockade of France, which prevented the import of sugarcane from the Caribbean.

From 1815 to 1830, Belgium was part of the United Kingdom of the Netherlands. The kingdom preferred raw cane sugar from its colony Java over raw sugar made from sugar beet. This policy was actually very profitable for the Southern Netherlands. The superior harbor of Antwerp made that shipping lines preferred to ship the Java raw sugar over there, instead of to the harbors of the former Dutch Republic.

After the 1830 Belgian Revolution, the Belgians regained Antwerp in December 1832 after a long siege. In spite of now possessing one of the best harbors of Europe, the Belgians did not gain access to a source of cheap raw cane sugar. In general, the powers which had colonies that produced raw cane sugar took all kinds of customs and fiscal measures that directed raw sugar shipments to their home ports. In turn they protected their domestic refineries by a high tariff on imported refined sugar.

The conflict with the Netherlands also meant that Belgium wanted to get its own connections to Germany. For this it pressed the construction of railways. One of the first was the line from Leuven to Tienen, which opened on 22 September 1837. The railways would become very important for the growth of Tienen as a center for sugar production and other industries.

In 1837 the colossal Waterloo sugar factory opened, supported by the Belgian haute finance.

=== Predecessor companies ===
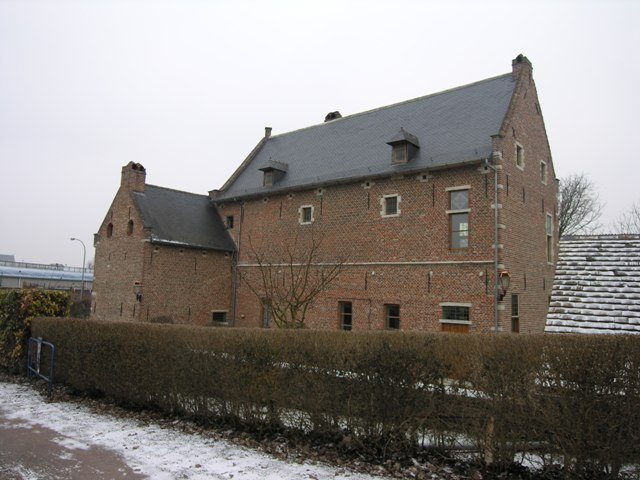
The Rectorswoning is a remnant of Barberendal convent.

On 16 May 1836 the municipality of Tienen issued two permits to operate a sugar factory. The requests had been made by Jozef Van den Berghe de Binckum and Pierre-Antoine Vanden Bossche.

The factory founded by Van den Berghe de Binckum would become the nucleus of the Raffinerie Tirlemontoise. It was built near the Begijnhof along the Borggracht. It started to operate on 18 November 1836 and then had 90 employees. The company also cultivated the required sugar beet. In April 1838 the factory concluded trials between different methods of slicing sugar beet. In the early years production was about 10 sacks of raw sugar per day. In 1844 the Van den Berghe factory had 4 atm high pressure steam engine(s) of 10 hp. On 3 November 1847 four employees of the sugar factory of Mr. Vandenberghe de Binckum got a gold medal for their courage during a fire that hit the Vandenberghe factory. In 1855 Joseph Vandenbergh de Binckom sold his factory to Henri Vinckenbosch.

The factory founded by Pierre-Antoin Vanden Bossche and his business partner Jean-Joseph Janssens was on Gilainstraat. It started to operate on 16 May 1836, the same day that it got a permit to do so. In 1844, the sugar factory of the Brothers Janssens and Mr. Vandenbosche had 4 atm high pressure steam engine(s) of 10 hp. In 1882 the sugar factory of the Van den Bossche brothers and Janssens was on the Rue de Diest. In 1863 the power of its steam engine had been increased to 20 hp. The factory had a warehouse for bones, three ovens for making bone char, and four ovens for its revification. The company also had a distillery with a steam engine of 5 hp. The Vanden Bosscche sugar factory would remain independent till 1905.

A third sugar factory was that of Pierre-Louis Vinckenbosch. It was in the former convent of Barberendal on the Molenstraat. Pierre-Louis and Henri Vinckenbosch were nephews. In 1841 the Notary Pierre-Louis Vinckenbosch came to own the former convent Oriënte in Geetbets. In 1842 he got a permit to operate a distillery on the premises. This was a distillery of potatoes, melasse and cereals.

A fourth sugar factory that was founded much later was that of Messrs. Blyckaerts. It had started as a factory for potato starch built on the Molenstraat in Haendoren along the Borchgracht. In 1856 a sugar beet distillery was added to it, which was soon transformed into a sugar factory. In 1882 this factory was also described as having ovens to produce and revive bone char. It would be merged into Vinckenbosch & Cie in 1886.

=== Vinckenbosch & Cie ===
In 1855 Henri Vinckenbosch bought the factory of Vandenbergh de Binckom. In 1862 Pierre Louis Vinckenbosch bought the small factories of Pierco and Raeymaekers. In 1862 the partnership Vinckenbosch & Cie was founded. That same year the factories of the nephews Henri and Pierre-Louis were merged. The mergers were a crucial step for the company which now began to develop more quickly.

From 1838 till 1875 the focus of the company was on agriculture. On 1,200 hectares, a dozen farms produced enough beet to feed a factory that could produce 30 t of sugar per day. A serious problem for the factories was that by nature sugar beet exhausts the soil. A regular cultivation of sugar beet only became possible after the invention of chemical fertilizers. By 1875, production capacity rose to 150 t per day.

In 1874 Victor Beauduin became director of the company. He would leave the cultivation of sugar beet to independent farmers and concentrate on the development of the industrial components of the company.

In 1876 the partnership Vinckenbosch & Cie was renewed. The division of shares gives some insight in how Vinckenbosch & Cie had grown. Edmond Vinckenbosch, Louis Vinckenbosch, and Victor Beauduin could sign for the partnership. The heirs of J.H. Vinckenbosch had 152 shares; Louis Vinckenbosch had 38 shares for himself; Louis Halflants 57; Pierre Pierco 38; Bonaventure Raeymaekers 38; Jean Pierco widow of Eugénie Raeymaekers and their heirs, amongst them Marie, wife of Victor Beauduin 38; Corneille Denis-Janssen and heirs 19; Victor Bauduin 24 shares for himself.

In 1882 the company was described as that of Messrs. Vinckenbosch & Cie in the Haendoren suburb. It had two steam engines, a sugar factory with refinery, four ovens for making bone char, four ovens to revive it, and a bone warehouse.

In 1886 Vinckenbosch & Cie bought neighboring sugar factory of Blyckaerts-Verlat. The old factory on the terrain Van den Berghe now became Factory I, while the Blyckaerts factory became Factory II.

On 17 September 1887 Edmond Vinckenbosch founded the public company La Raffinerie Tirlemontoise. In January 1888 Finance minister Auguste Beernaert and officials from his ministry visited the company. They took great interest in the extraction of sugar from molasses by separation and refining. The measuring devices and the contract to determine the amount of taxation were probably of even more interest.

=== Public company Raffinerie Tirlemontoise ===
Paul Wittouck and his brother, Frans owned a sugar factory in Wanze. In 1894 they took over Vinckenbosch & Cie, owner of the sugar refinery of Tienen, and turned it into a limited company. The brothers faced fierce competition from other sugar manufacturers in Belgium, but emerged as the dominant firm. Through a series of technical innovations and improvement the volume of sugar produced in Tienen rose from 7,000 tonnes in 1894 to 62,000 tonnes in 1913. The company began to export sugar and to take over other Belgian companies.

In 1931, the Chadbourne Agreement was a major international agreement on the production of sugar. However, due to the continued international overproduction the situation of the sugar industry remained difficult until the end of World War II.

By 1933 or earlier, the company operated the first continuous diffuser, invented by Julien Bergé. It marked the company's leadership in innovation. The horizontal type of rotating continuous diffuser is named "RT" after Raffinerie Tirlemontoise.

In 1949, F. Baerts, J. Dedek and G. Tibo of the Sugar refinery of Tienen invited several scientists form the European sugar industry to Brussels on 18 September 1949. This would lead to the foundation of the Commission Internationale Technique de Sucrerie (CITS).

In 1950, the production of white sugar started with 399,000 tonnes produced that year. After the establishment of the European Union in 1958, the common agricultural policy led to the regulation of the European sugar market in 1968. In 1987, 25 percent of the shares of the company were registered on the Brussels Stock Exchange.

=== Part of Südzucker ===
In 1989 Südzucker bought all shares of Raffinerie Tirlemontoise for about 2 billion guilders. All sugar activities went to Südzucker. The non-sugar activities (bread, chocolate, salades) were acquired by Raffinaderij Tienen (RT) Holding NV in Rotterdam. In 1999 the company decided to install a seed magma preparation installation in the Tienen plant to reduce production costs and to improve the quality of the sugar.

In 2001 Südzucker used its daughter Raffinerie Tirlemontoise to buy Saint Louis Sucre in a complex deal. In 2002 RT sold its 68% share in the Veurne Sugar Factory to the Groep Warcoing, which already owned the other 32%. It was one of the conditions the European Commission set for approving the acquisition of Saint Louis Sucre.

== Role of the railways ==
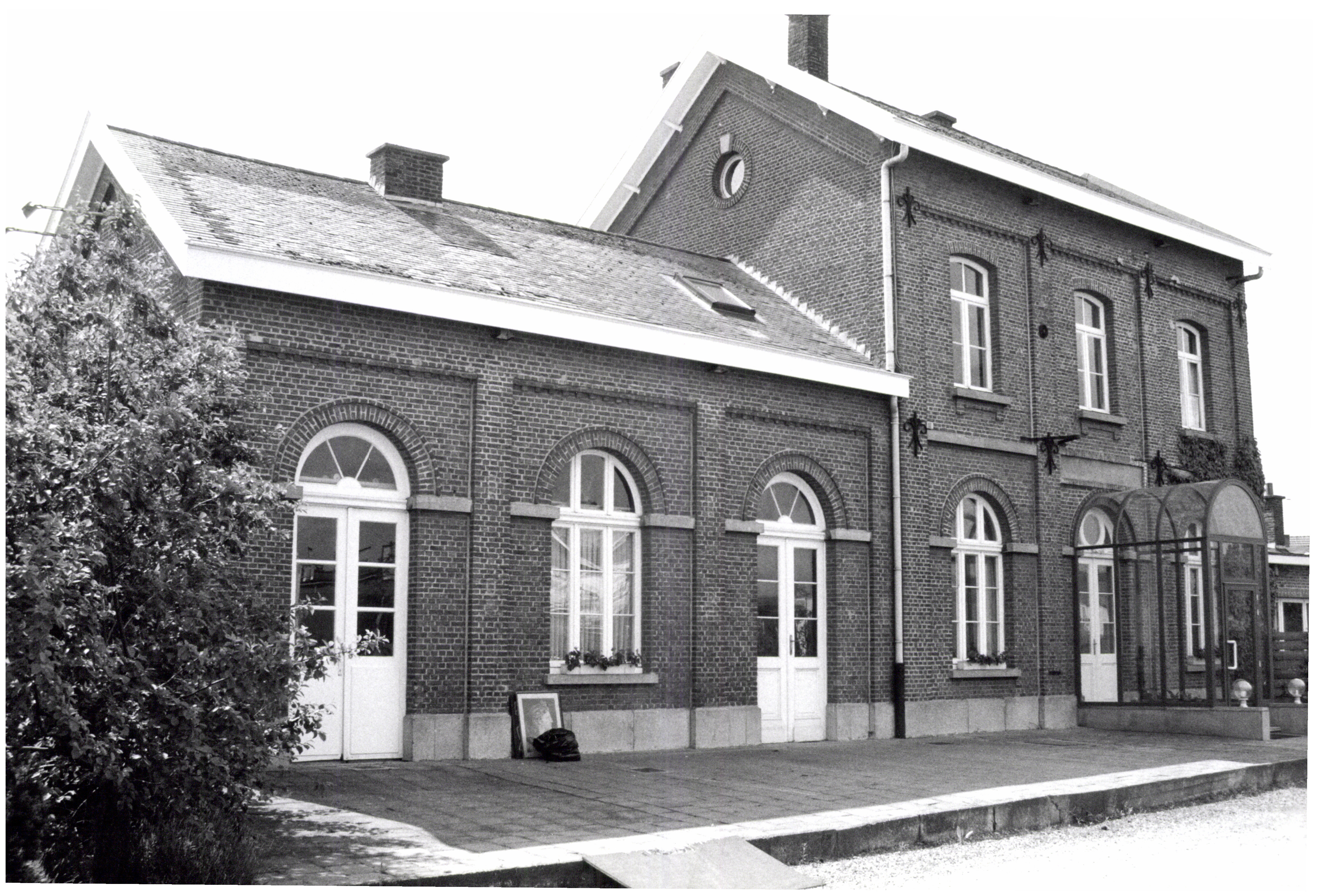
Former railway station in Grimde

The line 36 from Leuven to Tienen which opened on 22 September 1837 connected Tienen to Brussel and the sea. In 1842 this line was extended to Liège. The line from Tienen to Namur was opened in 1869. Line 22 to Diest followed in 1878, and line 23 to Tongeren in 1879.

The railways would become very important for the growth of Tienen as a center for sugar production and other industries. Coal from Wallonia was cheap, because it only had to be transported by wagon from the station in Tienen to the sugar factories. For sugar beet the procedure was more complicated. It first had to be transported by wagon to a stop somewhere in the fields. After loading the beet on the train to Tienen, they were again loaded in wagons for the final stretch to the factory. This was costly, but it still meant a big increase in the area from which it was economical to transport beet to the factory. This was very important, because sugar factories would require ever costlier machinery, and this could only be paid for by operating on a very large scale.

In 1886, a new station was built on line 22 at Grimde, now a suburb in the southeast of Tienen. This was much closer to the sugar factory and also had a classification yard. The company then built a material ropeway from the station straight to its Factory I. After the French téléphérique the locals called the containers telefrikskes. These transported coal and beet till 1914. Near the station a large warehouse was built. In 1899 two narrow-gauge railways were built. One from the station to the beet reception area of Factory I and another from the station to Factory II. In 1905 a normal railway was laid between the two factories. This was 4 km long, because it had to handle a height difference of about 10 m. It went from Factory II to Piepelboom, Grimde station, along The Three Tumuli and to the beet reception area of Factory I.

In 1907 the light railway Buurtspoorweg 315 (NMVB) to Sint-Truiden was opened, followed by a section to Jodoigne. These trams went up to Factory I, and transported passengers and sugar beet. From Factory II, the beet carriages were then pulled to Factory I over the connecting normal railroad.

== See also ==
- Carbonatation
- Citrique Belge
- Wittouck family

== Sources ==
- "De Geschiedenis van de Tiense Suiker – Expansie voor de Grote Oorlog" (in Dutch). Tiense Suikerraffinaderij. 2013. Archived from the original on 2015-10-03.
- "Locations". Raffinerie Tirlemontoise.
- "Le 75me Anniversaire de la Raffinerie Tirlemontoise". Le Vingtième Siècle. 16 September 1913.
- "Actes de Courage et Dévouement". L'Indépendance Belge. 24 November 1847.
- "Suiker: historische situering". Tienen tintelende stad.
- "Fabrication du Sucre des Betteraves". L'Emancipation. 10 May 1838.
- Recueil des actes et des proces-verbaux du Conceil Provincial de Brabant, G. Stapleaux, Bruxelles, 1845
- "Commerce, Industrie, Finances". Gazette de Charleroi. 12 January 1888.
- Mélot, Albert (1909), "Monographies Industrielles", A travers le Congo belge, vol. II, L'Expansion belge, pp. 631–636
- Bijzondere verzameling van de akten, uittreksels uit akten, vol. IV, Moniteur Belge, Bruxelles, 1875
- Moniteur belge: journal officiel. - Staatsblad 1888,7/9, vol. 3rd trimester, Drukkerij van den Moniteur Belge, Brussel, 1888
- Wauters, Alphonse (1882), Géographie et histoire des communes belges, vol. VII, Decq et Duhent, Bruxelles
- Maho, Dieter (2009), Industrieel erfgoed: De Tiense Suikerraffinaderij en zijn directe omgeving (PDF), Katholieke Universiteit Leuven
- Draye, Greet (2016), Tiense Suiker & de IJzerenweg Inhoudelijk vooronderzoek (PDF), Katholieke Universiteit Leuven
- "Rectorswoning klooster Barberendal". Inventaris Vlaanderen is erfgoed. 4 April 1995.
- "Herenwoning en distilleerderij op cisterciënzerinnendomein". Inventaris Vlaanderen is erfgoed. 30 September 2014.
- Liste générale des fabriques de sucre, vol. Campagne 1877-78, Bureaux du Journal des Fabricants de Sucre, 1878
- "Geschäftsbericht 2022/23" (PDF). Südzucker.
- Dye, Alan; Sicotte, Richard (2006), "How brinkmanship saved Chadbourne: Credibility and the International Sugar Agreement of 1931" (PDF), Explorations in Economic History, 43 (2): 223–256, doi:10.1016/j.eeh.2005.01.001, archived from the original (PDF) on 30 December 2003
- Ruytings, D. (2005), "Equipment and factory experiences with seed magma production by cooling crystallization", International Sugar Journal, 107: 666–667
- "Suiker-fabrikanten". De Avondpost. 18 January 1934.
- "Groep Warcoing wordt eigenaar suikerfabriek Veurne". Het Belang van Limburg. 22 May 2002.
- Flallo, Laurent (2 July 2001). "L'allemand Südzucker met l'industrie européenne du sucre en ébullition". Les Échos.
- "Belgische suiker naar Duitsers". Het Parool. 3 November 1989.
