= Paul Wittouck =

Belgian industrialist (1851–1917)

Paul Grégoire Pierre Wittouck
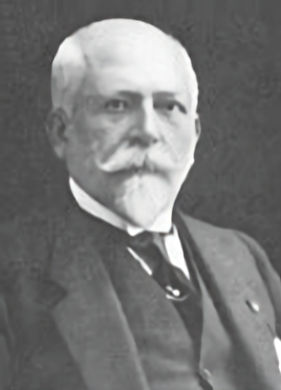
- Paul & Frantz Wittouck
- Born: 6 August 1851; Sint-Pieters-Leeuw, Belgium
- Died: 9 November 1917 (aged 66); Uccle, Belgium
- Occupation: Industrialist
- Family: Wittouck family

Paul Grégoire Pierre Wittouck (6 August 1851 – 9 November 1917) was a Belgian industrialist. He and his brother Frantz Wittouck became the largest sugar manufacturers in Belgium in the period leading up to the Great War. He was the grandson of Lawyer and High Magistrate Guillaume Wittouck.

== Sugar manufacturer ==
Coat of arms of the Wittouck family.

Paul's career was shaped by his father Félix-Guillaume Wittouck (1812-1898) giving him ever larger responsibilities. In 1881 Paul's father gave him a sugar factory in Princenhage, Breda. At the time this might have referred to the management only. In 1882 Paul Wittouck was indeed mentioned as director of the Breda sugar factory. In May 1883 the sugar factory in Bergen op Zoom was suddenly referred to as that of 'Messrs. Wittouck'. In January 1884 there was talk of the sugar factory of Paul Wittouck in Breda and Bergen op Zoom.

Later, Paul and his brother Frantz Wittouck (1855–1914) owned a sugar factory in Wanze. They were the first in Belgium to produce crystallized sugar, and to sell sugar lumps. The sugar factory at Wanze became the largest in Belgium after its reorganization by Paul Wittouck in 1887. During the 1887–88 period the factory used the juice of 2,000,000 kilograms (4,400,000 lb) of beets daily, extracted in 13 new plants. The manufacturing steps included carbonation, filtration, evaporation, cooking and processing by turbines.

In 1894 the brothers took over Vinckenbosch & Cie and turned it into a limited company. Vinckenbosch's sugar refinery of Tienen (French: Raffinerie Tirlemontoise) had been founded in 1836–38. The brothers faced fierce competition from other sugar manufacturers in Belgium, but emerged as the dominant firm. Through a series of technical innovations and improvement the volume of sugar produced in Tienen rose from 7,000 tonnes in 1894 to 62,000 tonnes in 1913. The company began to export sugar and the take over other Belgian companies. The Wanze and Tienen plants were integrated into one industrial group shortly before the outbreak of World War I in 1914. During the war the factories struggled to continue operations, but were able to manufacture enough to supply the major cities.

== Château ==
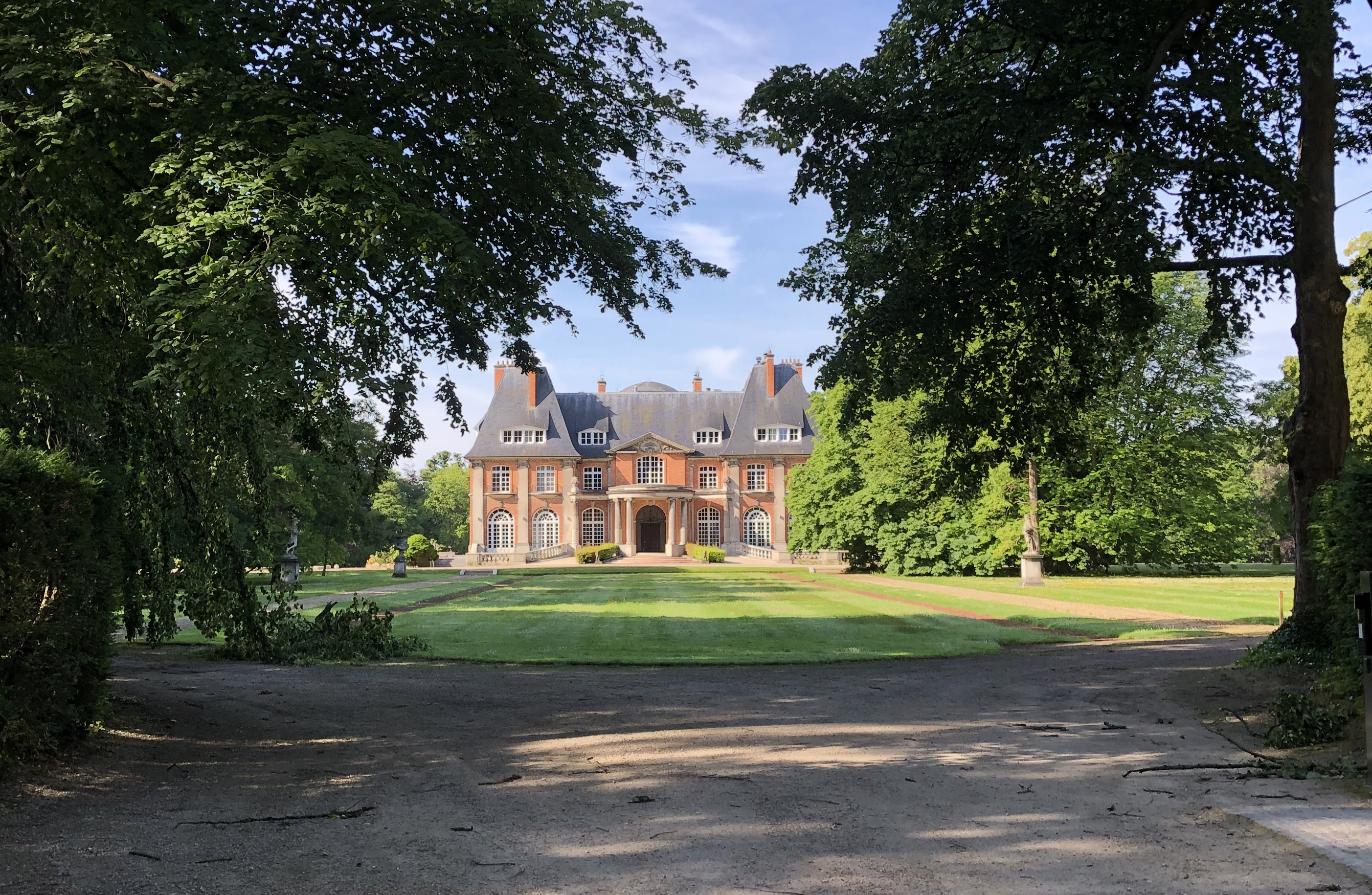
Château de La Fougeraie

The Château de La Fougeraie was built for Paul Wittouck in 1911 by the architects Louis Süe (1875–1968) and Paul Huillard (1875–1966). The engineer was L. Bogaerts. Gustave Louis Jaulmes (1873–1959) decorated the interior. Sue, Huillard and Jaulmes avoided Art Nouveau for the château, and instead chose the fashionable Louis XVI style "à la Greque".

== Sources ==
- "De Geschiedenis van de Tiense Suiker – Expansie voor de Grote Oorlog" (in Dutch). Tiense Suikerraffinaderij. 2013. Archived from the original on 2015-10-03.
- Institut français d'architecture (1991-01-01). Archives d'architecture du XXe siècle. Mauad Editora Ltda. ISBN 978-2-87009-446-4.
- Meuwissen, Eric (1996-07-26). "Fortunes de Belgique: Victor Allard." Le Soir (in French).
- "Objet SUELO-B-11-2. Château de La Fougeraie pour Paul Wittouck, Bruxelles (Belgique). 1911". Fonds Süe, Louis (1875-1968). 030 Ifa. Inventaire complet, réalisé par Susan Day, Sonia Gaubert, Marcos Carvalho-Canto sous la direction de Maurice Culot, Gilles Ragot. Centre d'archives de l'IFA. 2013-08-27.
- Swimberghe, Piet; Verlinde, Jan (1997). Living in Brussels. Translated by Maxim Crowley. Lannoo Uitgeverij. ISBN 978-90-209-4979-7.
- Tanret, M. (1888). "Sur une des bases extraites par M. Morin des liquides ayant subi la fermentation alcoolique". La Sucrerie indigène et coloniale (in French). Bureaux de la sucrerie indigène et coloniale.
- Van de Steenoven, Peter (2013). Suikerfabriek 'Wittouck' Breda (PDF). Geschied- en Oudheidkundige Kring van Stad en Land van Breda De Oranjeboom.
- "Binnenlandsch Nieuws". Dagblad van Zuidholland en 's Gravenhage. 3 October 1882.
- "Binnenlandsch Nieuws". Provinciale Noordbrabantsche. 10 May 1883.
- "Binnenland". Tilburgsche courant. 24 January 1884.
