= Guillaume Wittouck =

Belgian lawyer (1749–1829)

- Baptized: born 30 October 1749 in Drogenbos
- Died: 12 June 1829; Brussels
- Occupations: Lawyer and High Magistrate
- Spouse: Anne Marie Cools
- Family: Wittouck family

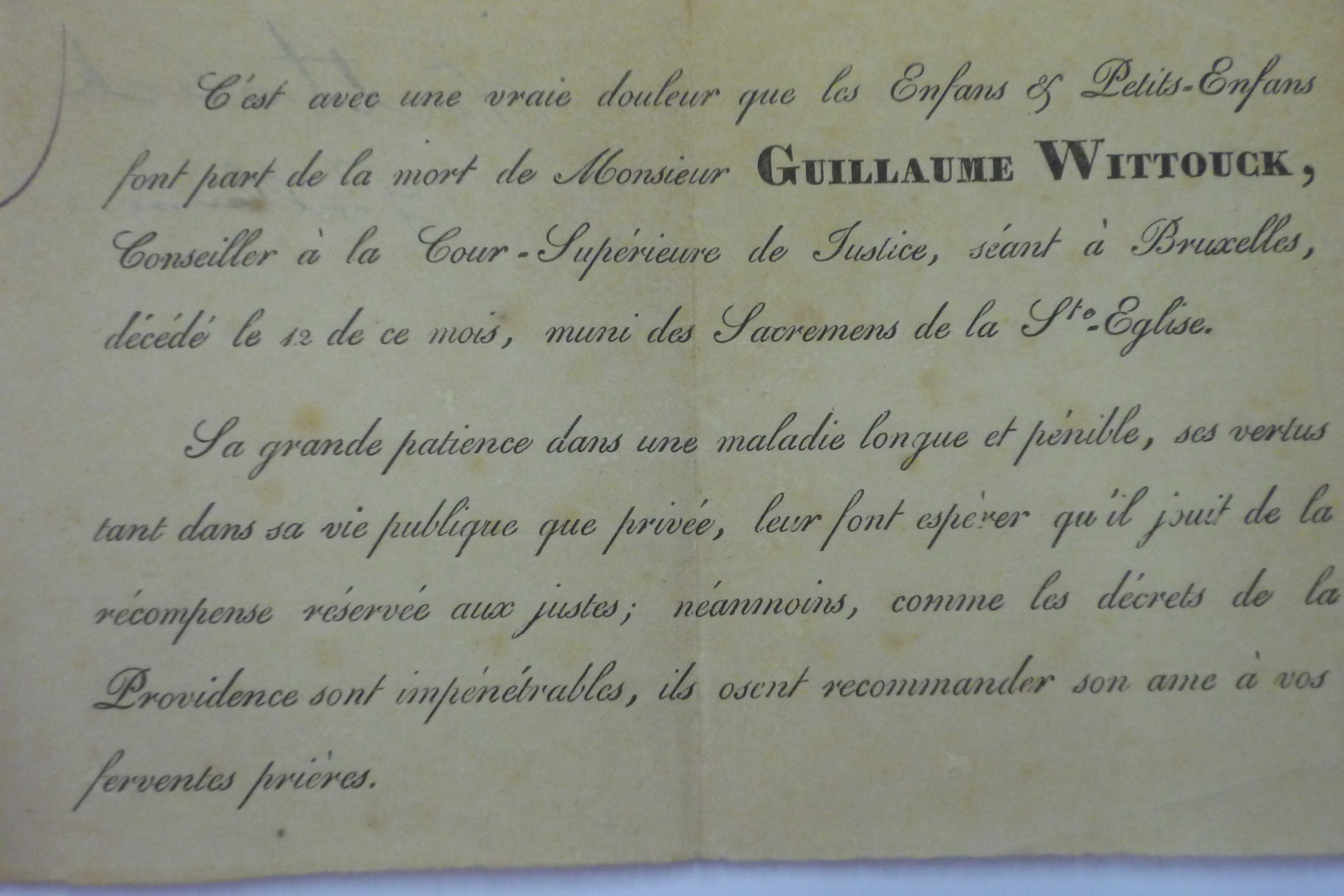
Death notice of Guillaume Wittouck, death in Brussel 12 June 1829.

Guillaume Wittouck (1749 - 1829) was a lawyer and High Magistrate born in the Austrian Netherlands. He was the Grandfather of industrialist Paul Wittouck and of Belgian navigator Guillaume Delcourt.

== Biography ==
Guillaume Wittouck, born in Drogenbos on 30 October 1749 and died in Brussels on 12 June 1829, lawyer at the Brabant Council, became Counselor at the Supreme Court of Brabant in 1791. During the Brabant Revolution, he sided with the Vonckists, who were in favor of new ideas. When Belgium joined France, he became substitute for the commissioner of the Directory at the Civil Court of the Department of the Dyle, then under the consulate, in 1800, judge at the Brussels Court of Appeal, then from 1804 to 1814, under the Empire, counselor at the Court of Appeal of Brussels, then advisor to the Superior Court of Brussels. He married in Brussels (Church of Saint Nicolas) on 29 June 1778, Anne Marie Cools, born in Gooik on 25 January 1754, died in Brussels on 11 April 1824, daughter of Jean Cools and Adrienne Galmaert descendants of the Seven Noble Houses of Brussels.

Guillaume Wittouck acquired on 28th Floreal of the year VIII (18 May 1800) the castle of Petit-Bigard in Leeuw-Saint-Pierre with a field of one hundred hectares. Petit-Bigard will remain the home of the elder branch until its sale in 1941.
