= Guillaume Delcourt =

Lieutenant at sea, 1st class Guillaume Delcourt Off. OL, Military Cross, ComC
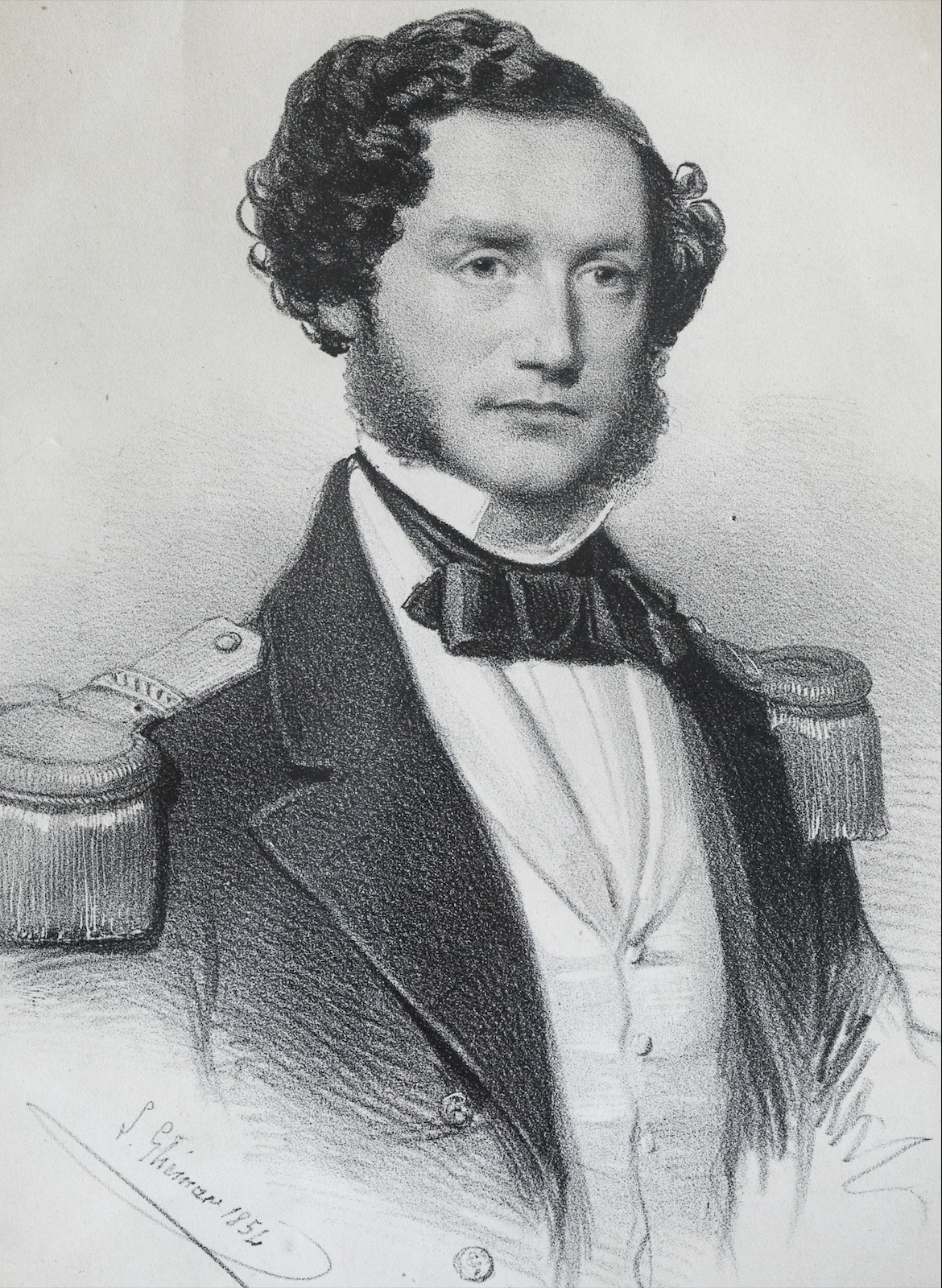
- Portrait of Delcourt (lithography by Louis-Joseph Ghémar, 1854)
- Born: Guillaume-Louis Delcourt; 31 March 1825; Brussels, Belgium
- Died: 2 February 1898 (aged 72) Antwerp, Belgium
- Allegiance: Kingdom of Belgium
- Branch: Royal Navy
- Rank: Lieutenant at sea, 1st class
- Conflicts: Battle of Rio Nunez
- Awards: Officer of the Order of Leopold, Military Cross, Commander of the Order of Christ (Portugal)
- Education: Royal Military Academy; École Nationale Supérieure du Génie Maritime (ENSTA Paris)
- Spouse: Laurence Hortense Joséphine Lambrechts (b. 1832)

Guillaume Delcourt (31 March 1825 – 2 February 1898) was a Belgian Royal Navy officer, navigator, naval engineer and maritime advisor to King Leopold II. He was one of the major players of early Belgian expansion around the world.

== Early life and family ==
Guillaume Delcourt's parents died young, leaving him an orphan as a child. His mother was Barbara Wittouck, who died in Brussels on 17 June 1830, and was daughter of the jurisconsult Guillaume Wittouck after whom Delcourt was named. His father Napoleon Joseph Delcourt, a brewer born in Ath, was injured while fighting for the Belgian Revolution in 1830 and died three years later in Antwerp on 30 July 1833. After the death of his parents, he was raised by his mother's sister, Jeanne Wittouck, and her husband, Jean-Louis Van Dievoet, Secretary of the Court of Cassation. He descended from the Houses of Serhuyghs, Sleeus, t'Serroelofs, Coudenbergh, and Roodenbeke of the Seven Noble Houses of Brussels through his mother.

== Education ==
After a brief career in banking, Delcourt was admitted at the Royal Military Academy in 1842 as an officer candidate of 2nd class. He graduated after two years as an officer candidate of 1st class.

== Career ==
In 1845, he started to sail on the Macassar; on board he had to face numerous challenges in the China Seas: typhoons, storms, grounding.etc. He then sailed for Batavia. In route for Singapore in 1847, his ship was attacked by pirates in the Riau straight. On his way back, it was almost shipwrecked.

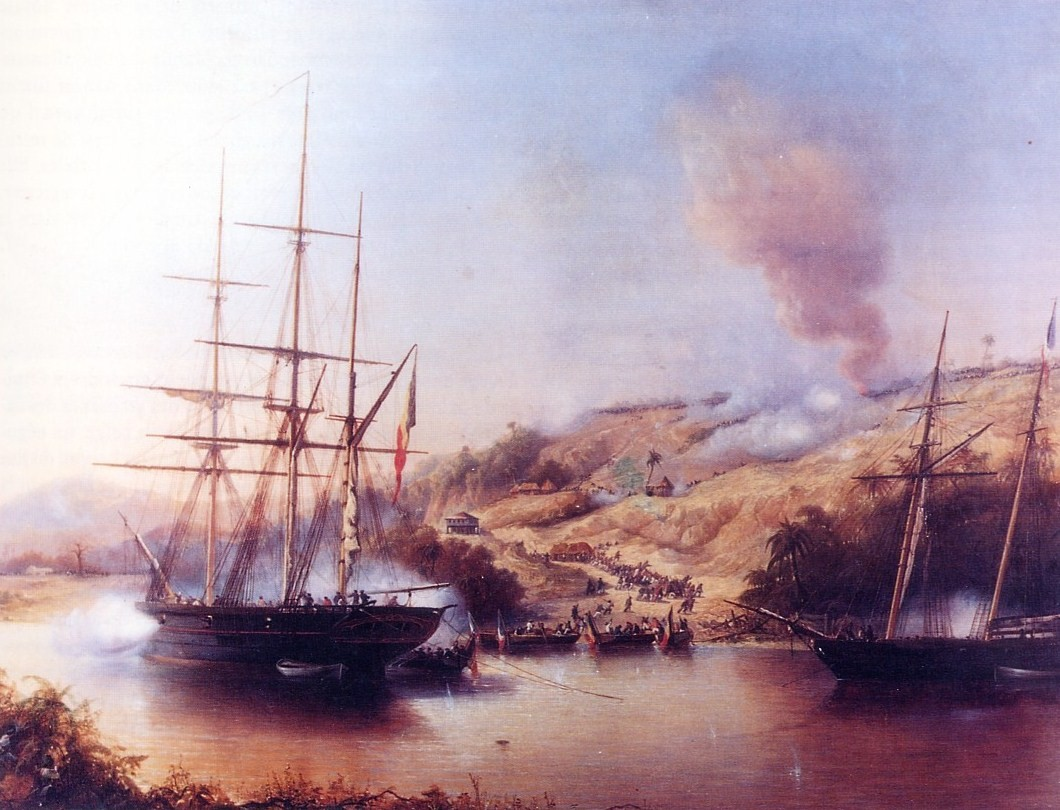
Belgian and French warships during the Rio Nuñez incident by Paul Jean Clays

Delcourt, then aboard the Louise Marie, sailed for the Rio Nunez, where Leopold I had created a colony, and arrived there on 10 February 1849. He participated in the Rio Nuñez incident on 23 March 1849. During his return, his ship silted up, found itself in a bad position and took shots from partisans of Mayoré but was saved by the Africans who stayed loyal to the Belgians.

After the successful campaign, Leopold I promoted him to the rank of Ensign at sea.

He made another trip in 1850 to the Rio Nunez, but the situation had worsened. He then left for the Belgian colony of Santo-Thomas, in Guatemala, which was also collapsing.

In 1851, he left once more on board the Louise-Marie to the Rio Nunez. On the island of Gorée, the Belgians received a message from the consul of Belgium L. Bols-Wittouck, a cousin of Delcourt, that asked them to get back to Rio-Nunez rapidly, as the situation was worsening.

Delcourt was made lieutenant at sea, 1st class, on 1 July 1863.

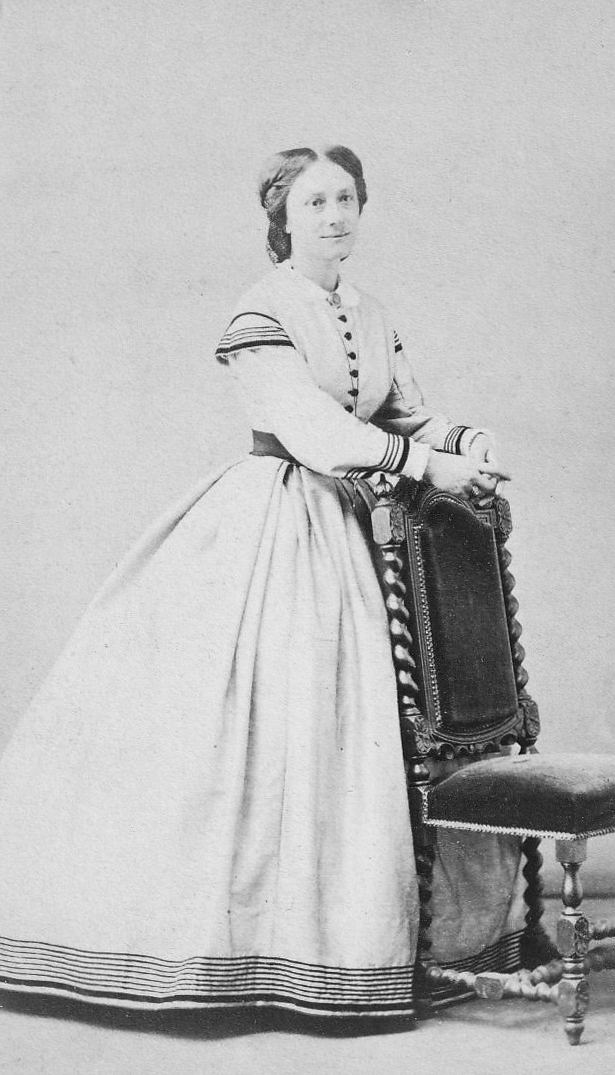
His wife, Laurence Lambrechts, daughter of Dr Pierre Joseph Lambrechts, Burgomaster of Hoboken.

In 1865, he was named engineer of maritime constructions, he helped develop the port of Antwerp. He became the maritime advisor of Leopold II and advised the king on the necessary maritime equipment for Sir Henry Morton Stanley and his expedition.

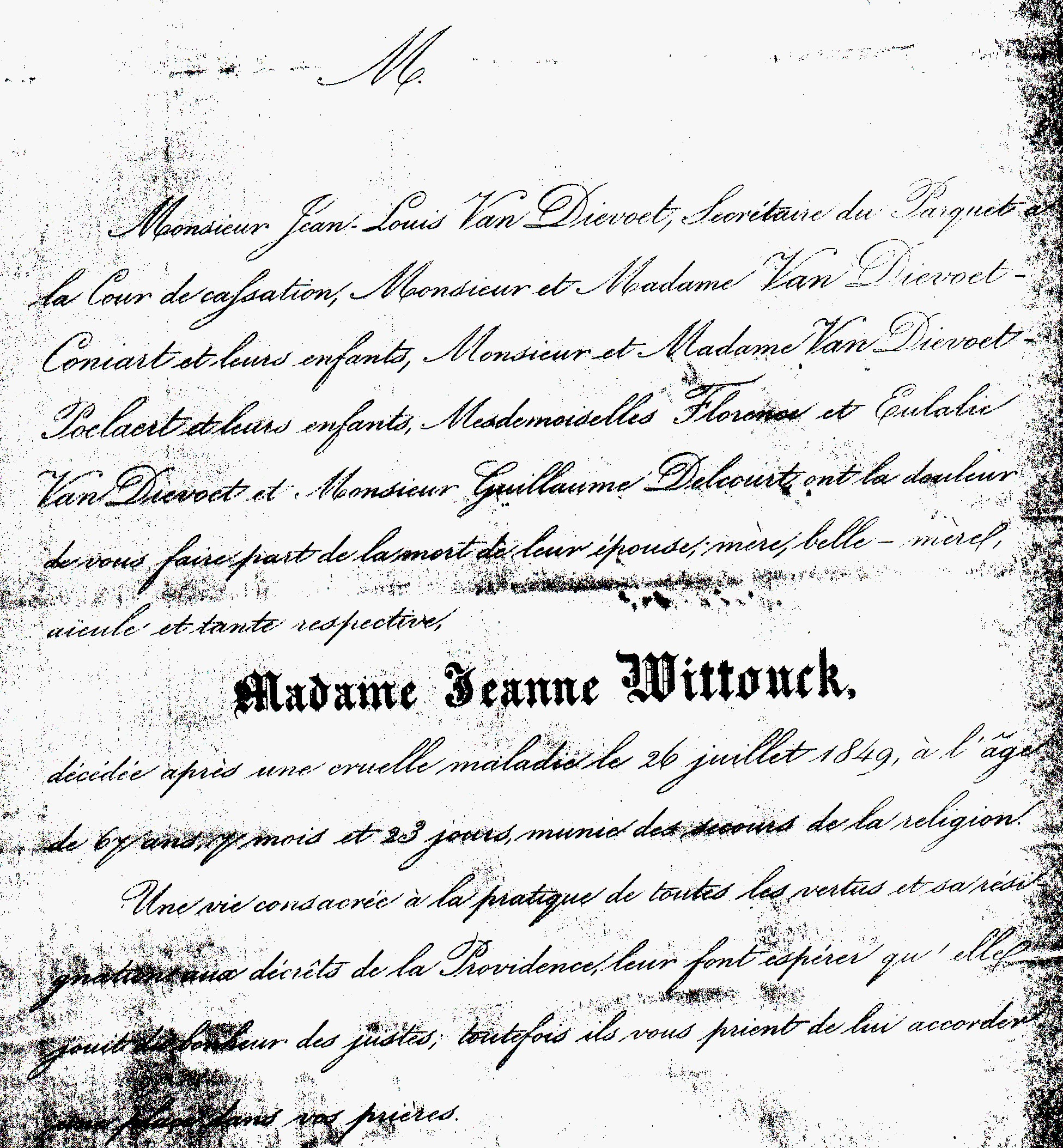
Guillaume Delcourt was mentioned in the announcement of the death of Jeanne Wittouck, his aunt who raised him after his parents' deaths.

== Legacy ==
His many writings are kept at the Royal Museum of the Armed Forces and Military History. These include his logbooks from his travels to Manila, Indonesia, and the West coast of Africa as well as his "extremely interesting" correspondence.

Archives of him are also kept at the Royal Museum for Central Africa.

== Publications ==
- 1872 : « Cours de navigation » (Navigation lessons).
- 1875 : « Précis du cours de construction et armement maritimes » (Summary of the maritime construction and armament course), Institut supérieur du commerce, Antwerp.
- 1876 : « Notice sur la vie et les travaux d'Auguste-Joseph-Ghislain-Aintoine Stessels » (Note on the life and work of Auguste-Joseph-Ghislain-Aintoine Stessels) as a member of the commission directrice des Annales des Travaux publics.
- 1879 : « Rapport sur l'amélioration des canaux, leur exploitation par réseaux » (Report on the improvement of canals, their exploitation by networks).
- 1879 : « Analyse de l'ouvrage de M. Finet » (Analysis of the work of M. Finet).
- 1880 : He collaborated on « Rapport sur les moyens d'étendre les débouchées de la Belgique dans les pays d'outre-mer » (Report on the Ways to extend Belgium's opportunities to overseas countries).
- 1881 : « Les moyens d'étendre les débouchées de la Belgique dans les pays d'outre-mer » (Ways to extend Belgium's opportunities to overseas countries), in the Bulletin de la Société de Géographie d'Anvers.
- 1886 : « Rapport sur les bâtiments de tous genres, materiel, etc. » (Report on buildings of all kinds, materials, etc.) as a jury member of group VII of the classes 70, 71 and 72 of the Antwerp World Fair of 1885.
- 1886 : « Sauvetage maritime, éclairage et balisage des cotres, sauvetage pour incendies et autres accidents » (Maritime rescue, lighting and marking of cutters, rescue for fires and other accidents).
- 1887 : « Notice sur le Stern-Wheel Ville de Bruxelles » (Notice on the Sternwheeler Ville de Bruxelles), in the Bulletin de la Société de Géographie d'Anvers.
- 1894 : « Notice sur le gaz à l'eau » (Notice on water gas).

== Honours ==
=== Belgium ===
- Officer of the Order of Leopold
- Military Cross, 1st class

=== Portugal ===
- Commander of the Order of Christ

== See also ==
- Wittouck family
