= Citrique Belge =

Citribel, located in Tienen is a Belgian biotech company and one of the biggest producers of citric acid. The company has a production capacity of 120,000 tonnes of citric acid per year. In 2020 it employed 340 people.

== History ==
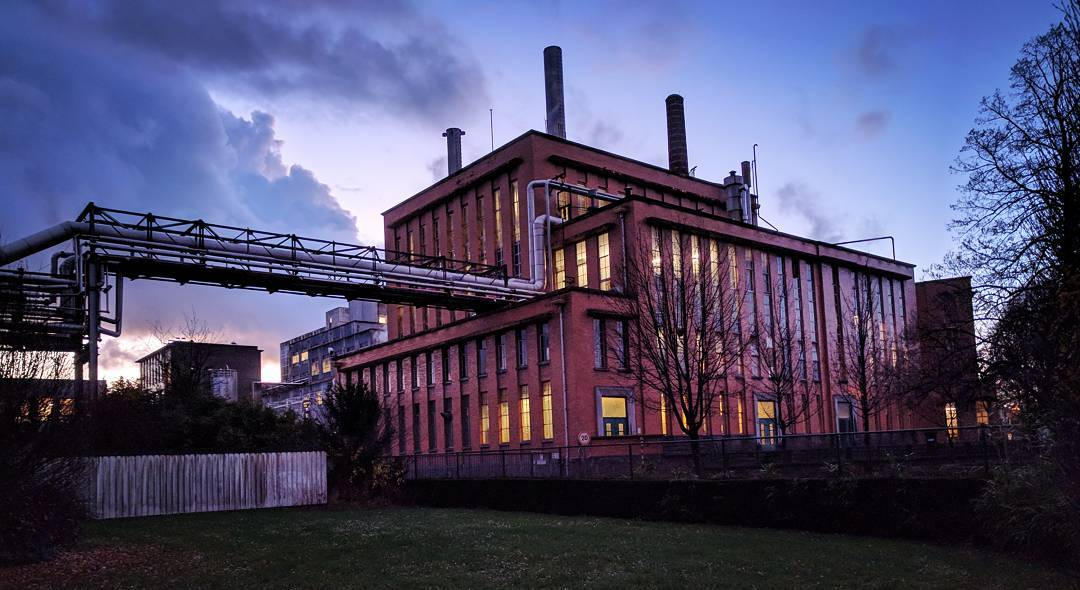
Citrique Belge Evening

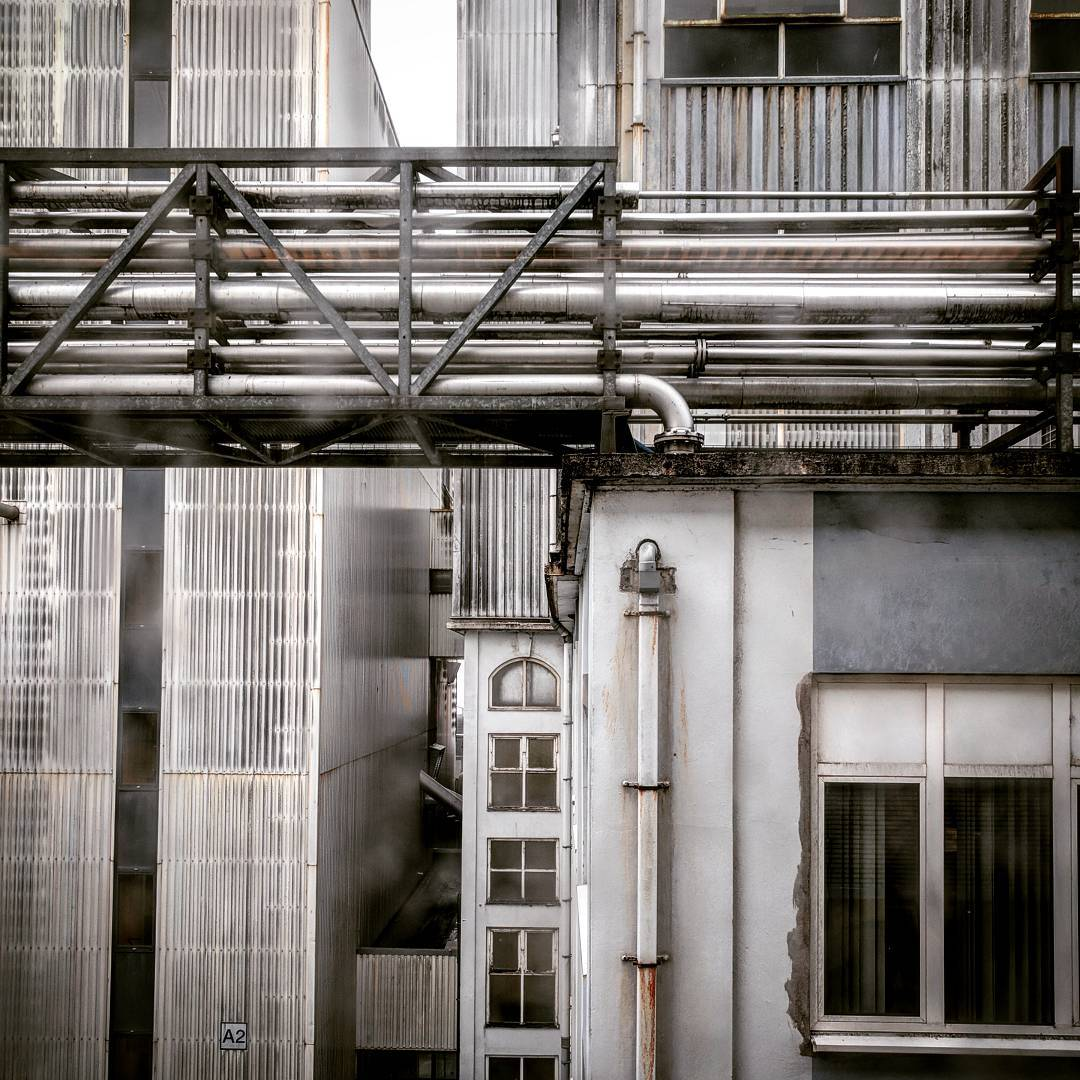
Citrique Belge Factory

In 1916, Alphonse Cappuyns and Arsène Smeets, both students from Leuven, started searching for the biological production of citric acid. First, they tried by letting random microorganisms ferment sugar into citric acid. Later they proceeded by selecting the Aspergillus niger fungus after which they achieved a productivity which allowed for industrial exploitation. This led to the foundation of the Belgian-Italian company La Citrique Belge in 1929. The Belgian know-how in fermentation was combined with the Italian know-how in refining citric acid. In 1947, the basic substrate sugar was changed with the cheaper by-product molasses and the production and profitability increased steadily. In 1977, Citrique Belge was acquired by Hoffmann–La Roche and after the acquisition, the production capacity of citric acid was more than doubled. In 2003, DSM took over the vitamin division of Roche, including Citrique Belge. In 2010, Citrique Belge was acquired by Adcuram, a German industrial holding. Subsequently, in 2016 Adcuram sold Citrique Belgique to Riflebird Capital from Brussels. Clema Capital from Luxembourg announced a takeover of Citrique Belge in November 2020.

== See also ==
- Sugar refinery of Tienen

== Sources ==
- F. Smeets, Microbial production of citric acid, Antonie van Leeuwenhoek, Volume 49, Number 1, January, 1983, pp. 86–87
