= Tienen =

Tienen: Tirlemont (French)
- City and municipality
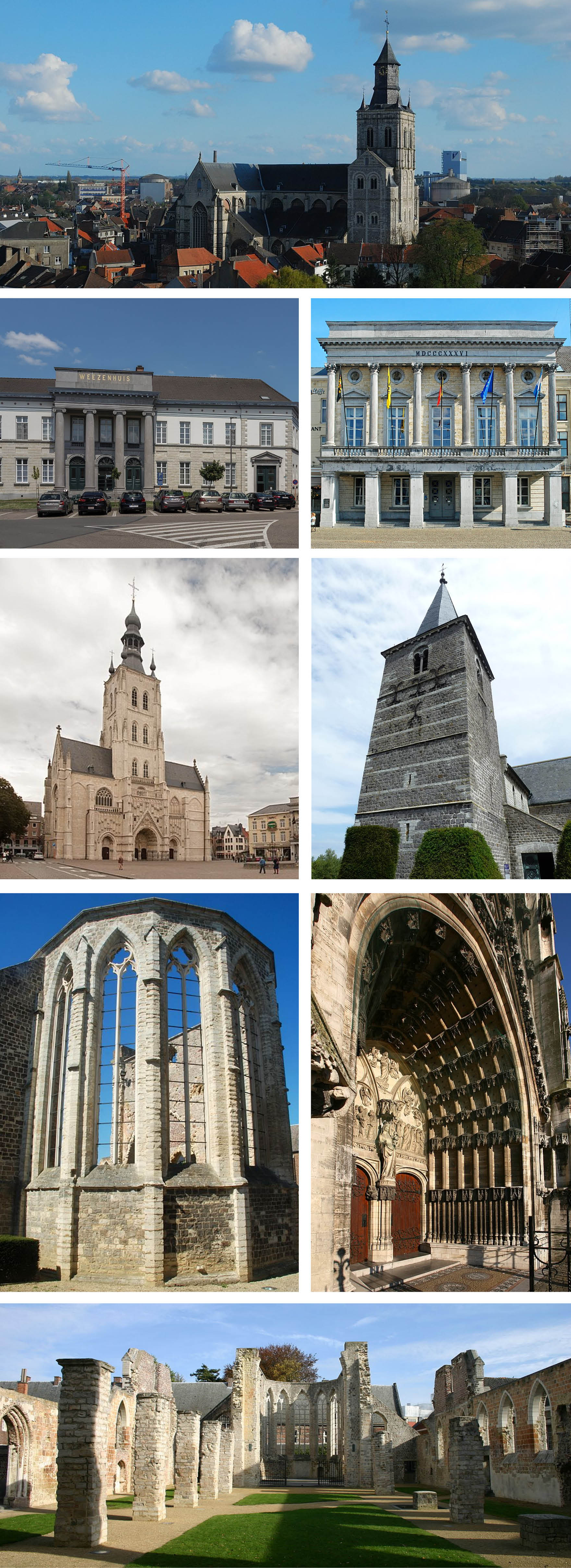
- Collage of Tienen

- Flag Coat of arms

- Tienen in the Province of Flemish Brabant
- Interactive map of Tienen
- Location in Belgium
- Coordinates: 50°48′N 04°56′E
- Country: Belgium
- Community: Flemish Community
- Region: Flemish Region
- Province: Flemish Brabant
- Arrondissement: Leuven

Government
  - Mayor: Jonathan Holslag (Durf)
  - Governing parties: Durf, Tienen Anders, N-VA, Anders.Tienen

Area
  - Total: 72.77 km^{2} (28.10 sq mi)

Population (2024-01-01)
  - Total: 36,581
  - Density: 502.7/km^{2} (1,302/sq mi)
- Postal codes: 3300
- NIS code: 24107
- Area codes: 016
- Website: www.tienen.be

Tienen (Dutch pronunciation: [ˈtinə(n)]; French: Tirlemont [tiʁləmɔ̃]) is a city and municipality in the province of Flemish Brabant, in Flanders, Belgium. The municipality comprises Tienen itself and the towns of Bost, Goetsenhoven, Hakendover, Kumtich, Oorbeek, Oplinter, Sint-Margriete-Houtem and Vissenaken.

On 1 January 2026, Tienen had a total population of 36.962. The total area is 71.77 km^{2} (27.71 sq mi), which gives a population density of 444 inhabitants per square kilometre (1,150/sq mi).

== History ==
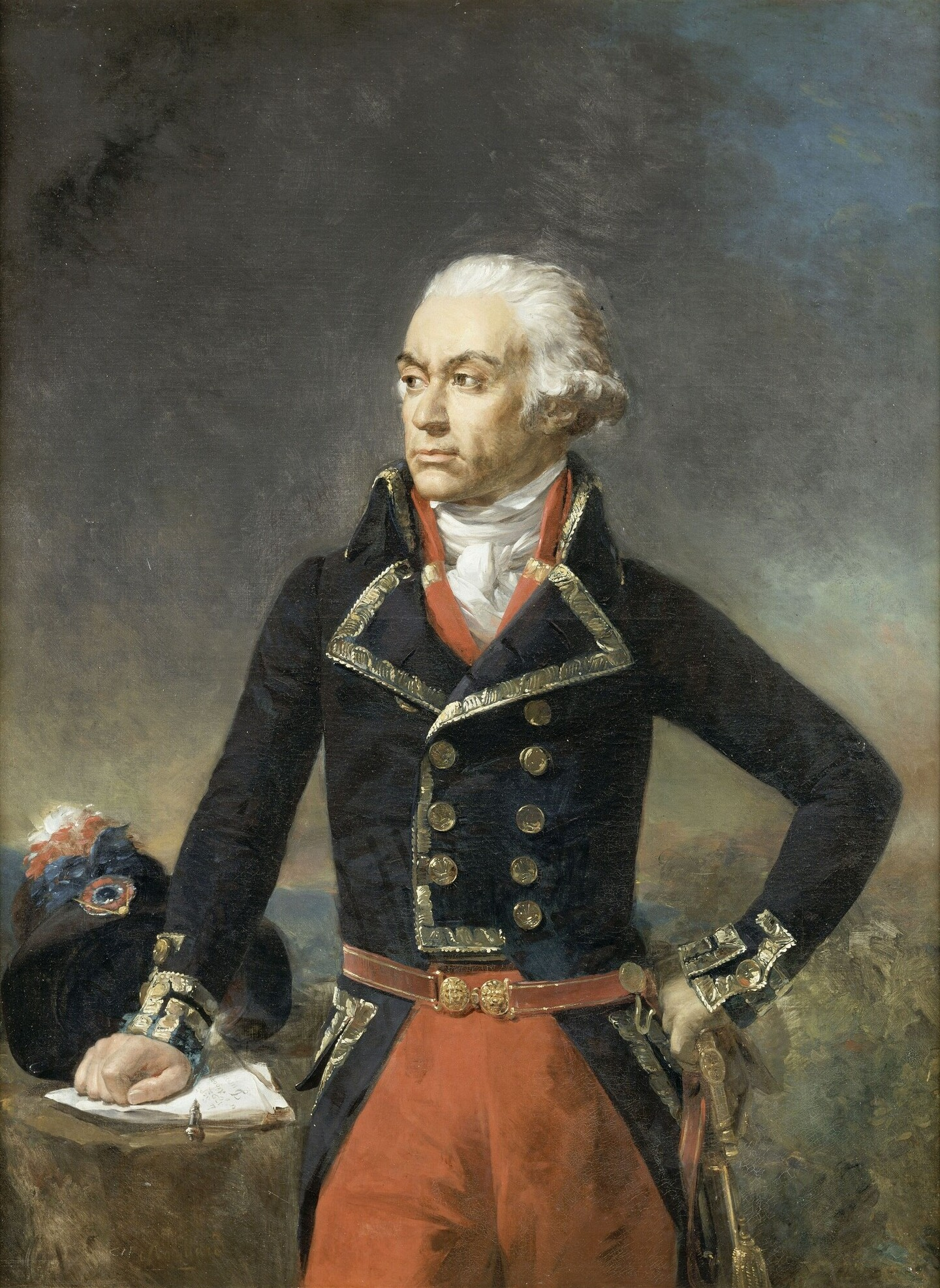
French commander Charles François Dumouriez, who used the town as a base during the March 1793 Battle of Neerwinden.

Tienen was once a Roman settlement and trade center with roads to other important places. In the early Middle Ages, the town was probably ruled by an old German family Thienen.

During the 1635 to 1659 Franco-Spanish War, Tienen was part of the Spanish Netherlands and was captured by a combined Franco-Dutch army in May 1635. Its capture resulted in one of the most serious atrocities of the Dutch Revolt; the town was sacked, over 200 civilians killed and many buildings damaged, including Catholic churches and monasteries. This ended Dutch prospects of winning over the predominantly Catholic population of the Southern Netherlands.

After the 1714 Treaty of Utrecht, the town was incorporated into the Austrian Netherlands; in the French Revolutionary Wars, it was used as a base by French Republican General Charles François Dumouriez during the Battle of Neerwinden. On 16 March 1793, the French repulsed an Austrian army commanded by Prince Josias of Coburg. This was the last victory for the veteran Dumouriez, hero of Valmy and Jemappes; within a week, his army suffered such catastrophic defeats that he defected to the French Royalists.

During World War I, Tienen was occupied by German forces after they broke through the Belgian defensive lines at the Battle of Halen and the Battle of Saint-Marguerite Woodem. In total, 60 houses were destroyed, a further 152 houses were damaged. About 100 soldiers and civilians from Tienen would eventually die during WWI.

In 1930, 100 years of Belgian independence was celebrated in Tienen. After the Great War, the city had also grown from about 7000 inhabitants in 1830 to 22.806 in 1930.

Tienen once again became a target during World War II. At the time, the town was an important railway junction. Nevertheless, the town was not seen as a strategic target. The Allies bombed Tienen as early as April 25, 1944 when the RAF dropped three bombs on Tienen, destroying three houses and killing a few inhabitants. The big bombing raid came on May 25, 1944. At around 11:15, the first bomb hit the local hospital. As a result of this bombing raid which lasted until 11:33, 13 civilians died and another 40 were injured. The city ended up being heavily damaged: over 200 houses were hit, 100 of which were declared uninhabitable. The old guest house was destroyed as well after the bombs largely failed to reach the intended targets, which were the local bridges and the ironway. Most houses of the beguinage of Tienen and the oil refinery were also destroyed. Countless windows were broken as a result of the blasts and men ended up leaving 400 homes in the town. Two bridges ended up being hit, one of which caused a small flooding of the area. A noteworthy victim of the Tienen bombing was the local Dean of Rochette, who died inside the confession booth when he refused to leave the town at the last moment because he wanted to comfort scared civilians. Today the regional cemetery of Tienen has an open Neogothic chapel that memorialises him. Tienen was liberated by Allied forces on September 7 of that year after the Germans fled in panic.

WWII ended up costing the lives of 80 inhabitants on Tienen: 40 soldiers and one civilian were executed, another 4 were killed for being part of the underground resistance and 19 people died after being deported to Germany, 7 of those being prisoners of war. In total, 549 houses were completely destroyed and another 2551 damaged.

== Economy ==
Tienen is the centre of sugar production in Belgium; a huge sugar beet processing factory, the Sugar refinery of Tienen (Tiense Suikerraffinaderij - Raffinerie Tirlemontoise), is located at the eastern edge of the town. It is the site of facilities owned by Citrique Belge, that produces citric acid, and Havells Sylvania, a manufacturer of energy saving lamps.

== Culture and significant landmarks ==
Tienen is the location of a summer rock festival known as 'Suikerrock'.

The Sint-Germanus (St. Germain) Church dates from the 12th century and has an altarpiece by the 19th-century painter Gustaaf Wappers. Its belfry has earned that complex a designation on the UNESCO World Heritage Site list of Belfries of Belgium and France.

The principal church, Onze-Lieve-Vrouw-ten-Poel (Our Lady of the Pool), was begun in the 12th and enlarged in the 15th century; it remains unfinished.

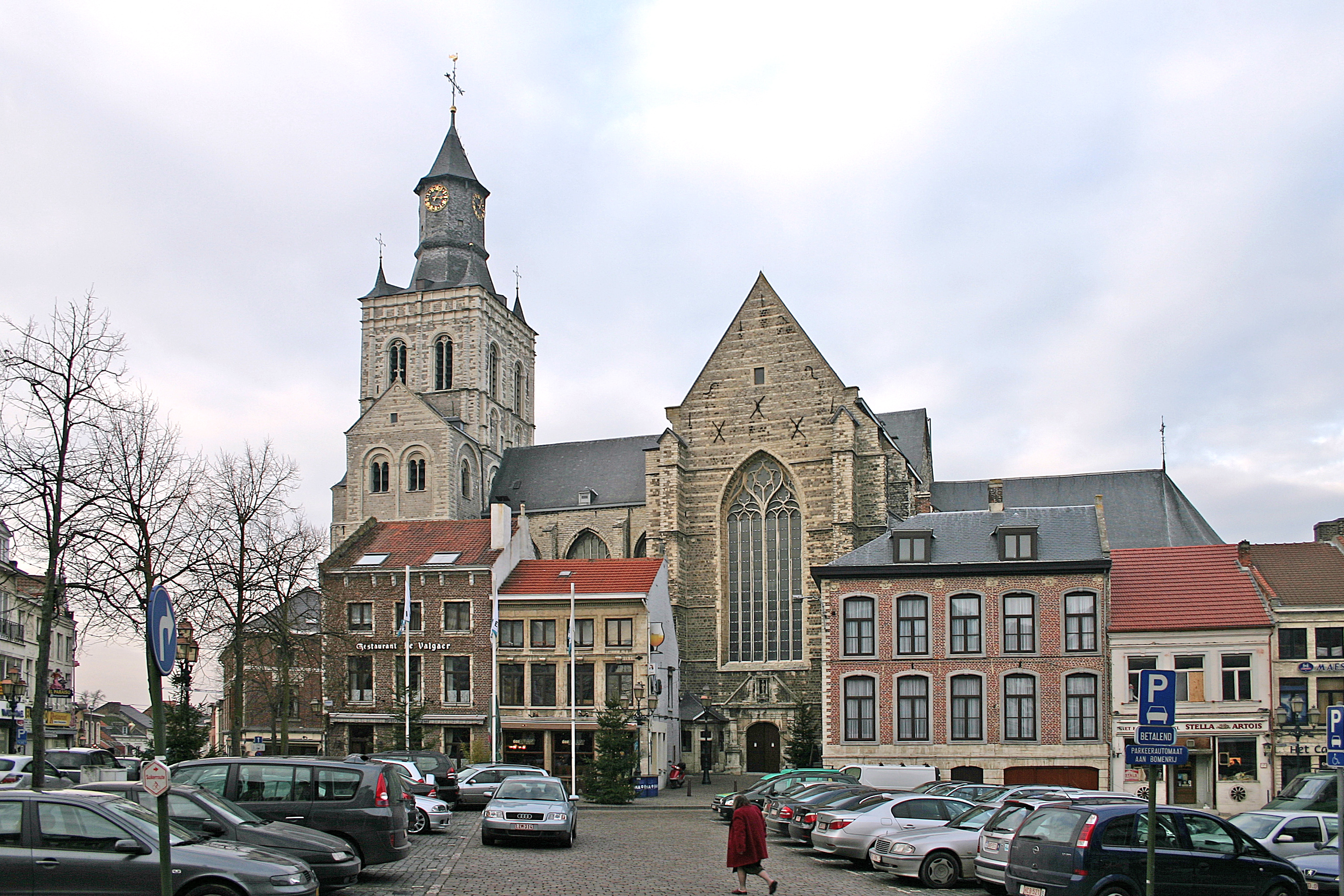
Sint-Germanus Church

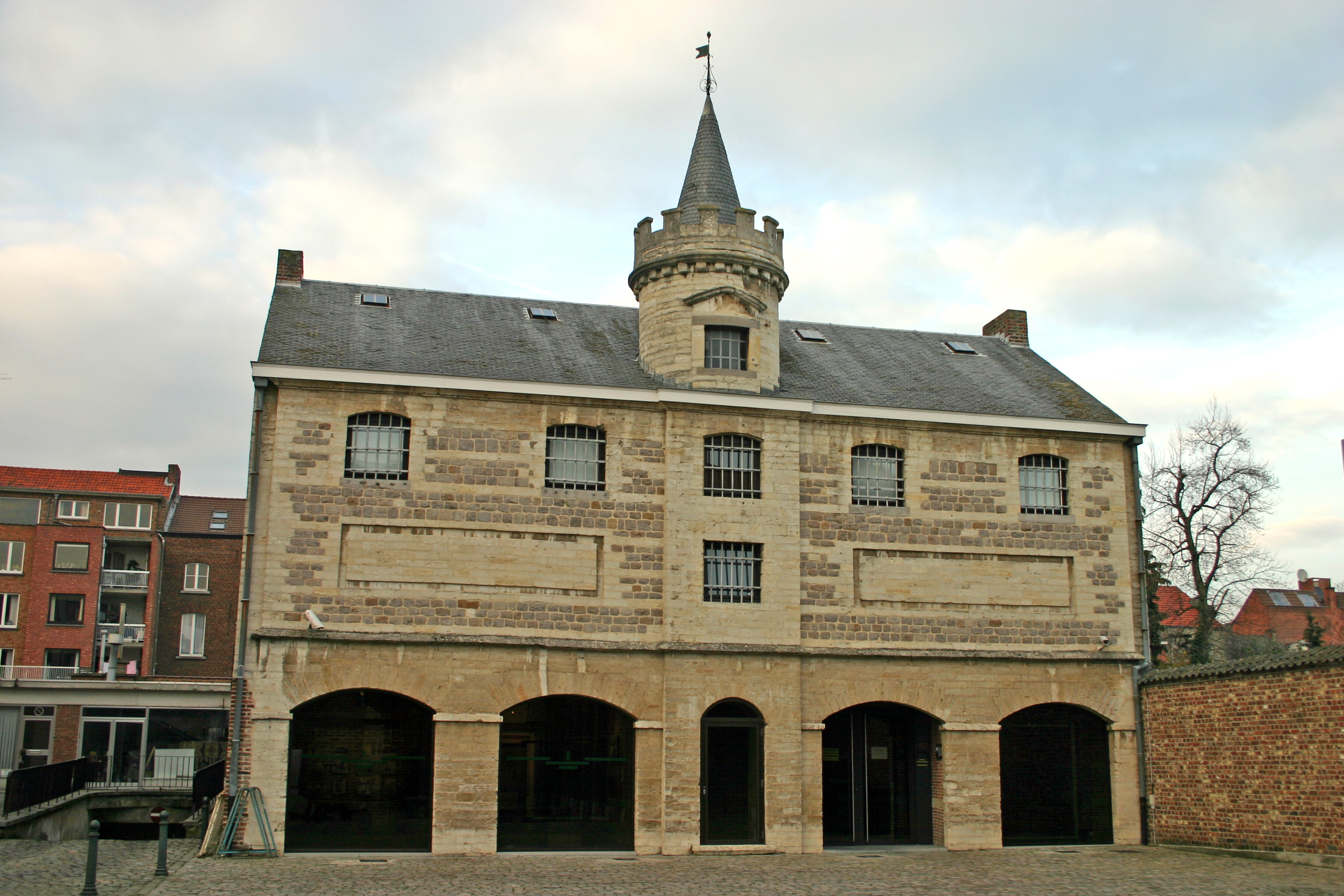
Het Toreke museum

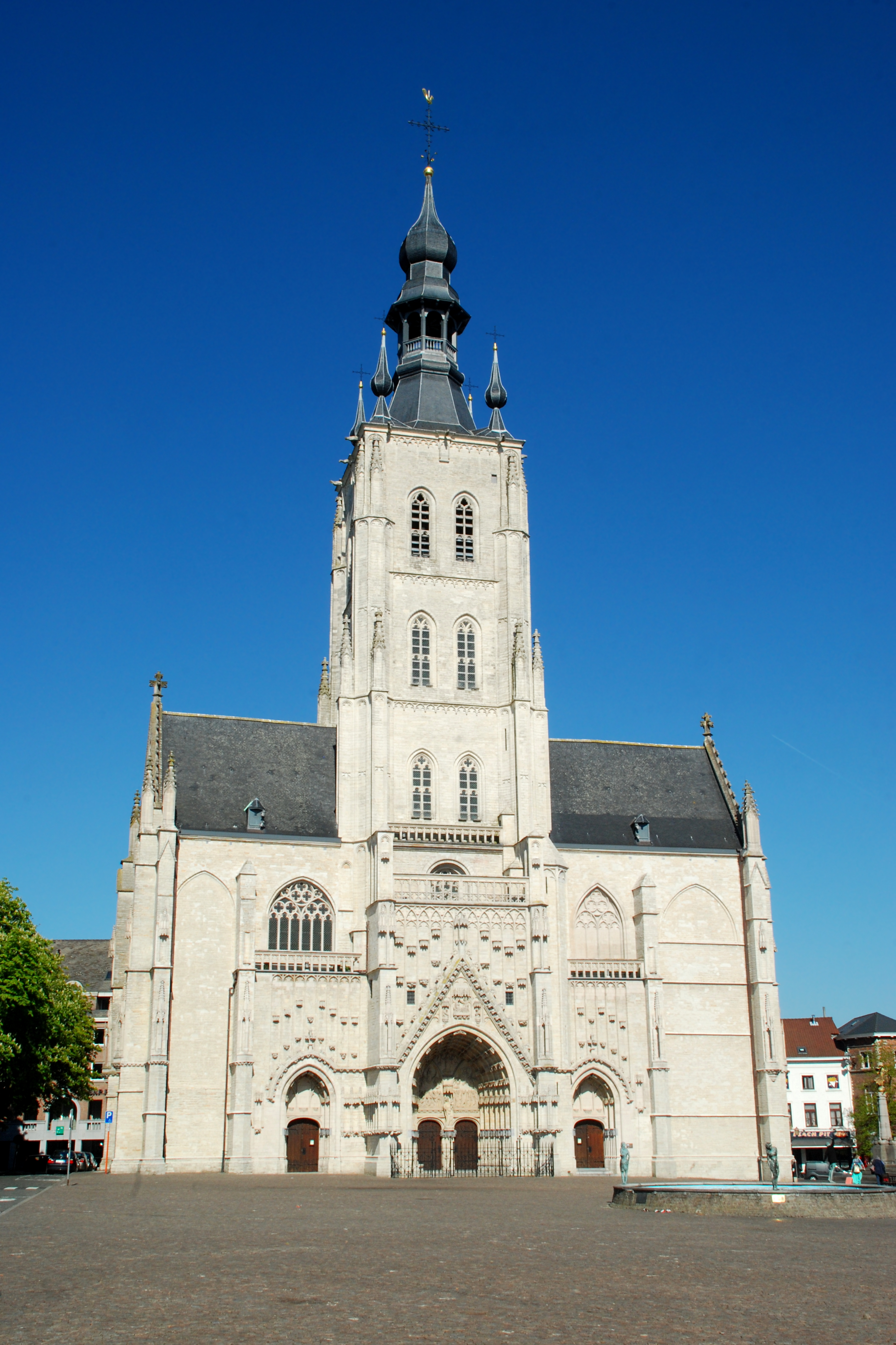
Onze-Lieve-Vrouw-ten-Poel

== Transport ==
The town is served by Tienen railway station, the oldest in Belgium still in use. There are also some taxi companies.

== Notable inhabitants ==
- Beatrijs of Nazareth (1200–1268), Flemish mystic
- André Vandewyer (1909–1992), Belgian footballer and coach
- Matthias Vanden Gheyn (1721–1785), composer, organist, and carillonist
- Linguist Herman Liebaers (1919–2010), was born in Tienen.
- Francis Halzen (b. 1944), Nobel Laureate in Physics 2026.
- Louis Michel (b. 1947), politician
- Luc van Acker (b. 1961), Belgian musician and producer
- Xandee (b. 1978), Belgian singer who represented Belgium in the Eurovision Song Contest 2004
- Mika Godts (b. 2005), Belgian football player

== International relations ==
=== Twin towns—Sister cities ===
Tienen is twinned with:

- Bielsko-Biała, Poland

== Sources ==
- Chisholm, Hugh, ed. (1911). "Tirlemont" . Encyclopædia Britannica. Vol. 26 (11th ed.). Cambridge University Press. p. 1010.
- De Périni, Hardÿ (1896). Batailles françaises, Volume III. Ernest Flammarion, Paris.
- Lasaffer, Randall (2006). "Siege Warfare and the Early Modern Laws of War". Tilburg Working Paper Series on Jurisprudence and Legal History. 06 (1).
- Soboul, Albert (1975). The French Revolution, 1787–1799. New York: Vintage. ISBN 0-394-71220-X.
- Thiers, Adolphe (1838). The History of the French Revolution.
