= Sophie de Schaepdrijver =

Belgian historian

Academic background
- Education: Vrije Universiteit Brussel; University of Amsterdam

Academic work
- Discipline: history

Sophie, Baroness De Schaepdrijver (b. Kortrijk, 11 September 1961) is a Belgian historian.

== Education ==
She graduated in history at the Vrije Universiteit Brussel (Brussels, Belgium) and obtained a PhD with a dissertation on Elites for the Capital? Foreign Migration to mid-nineteenth-century Brussels at the University of Amsterdam.

== Career ==
From 1986 until 1988, de Schaepdrijver was assistant professor at the department of history of the Free University of Amsterdam. From 1988 until 1990, she worked as a dissertation fellow at the Amsterdam School for Social Science Research. She worked from 1990 until 1991 as associate professor at the department of history of Groningen University. From 1991 until 1995, she worked as associate professor at Leiden University.

She left for the United States in 1995, where from 1995 until 1996, she was a fellow at the National Humanities Center, Research Triangle Park, N.C. From 1996 until 2001, she was a visiting associate professor at New York University. From 1999 until 2000 she worked as a visiting fellow at Princeton University. Since 2001, she is associate professor of modern European history at the Pennsylvania State University.

In 2005-2006 she was a fellow at the Netherlands Institute for Advances Study (NIAS) in Wassenaar.

== Bibliography ==
- De Groote Oorlog: het Koninkrijk België in de Eerste Wereldoorlog (E: The Great War: the kingdom of Belgium in the First World War), (1997)
- Taferelen uit het burgerleven, (2002)
- Gent: een stadsmuseum in Vlaanderen (2002).

== Awards ==
- 1990 - Maurits Naessens Award (Bank van Parijs en de Nederlanden) for her dissertation.
- 1999 - Arkprijs van het Vrije Woord.
- 2016 - by Royal Decree of 10 July 2016 de Schaepdrijver was given the non-hereditary title of baroness.

== Sources ==
- (archive) De Groote Oorlog (in Dutch)
- Sophie De Schaepdrijver
