= Waterloo sugar factory =

Sugar factory in Belgium, 1836 to 1871

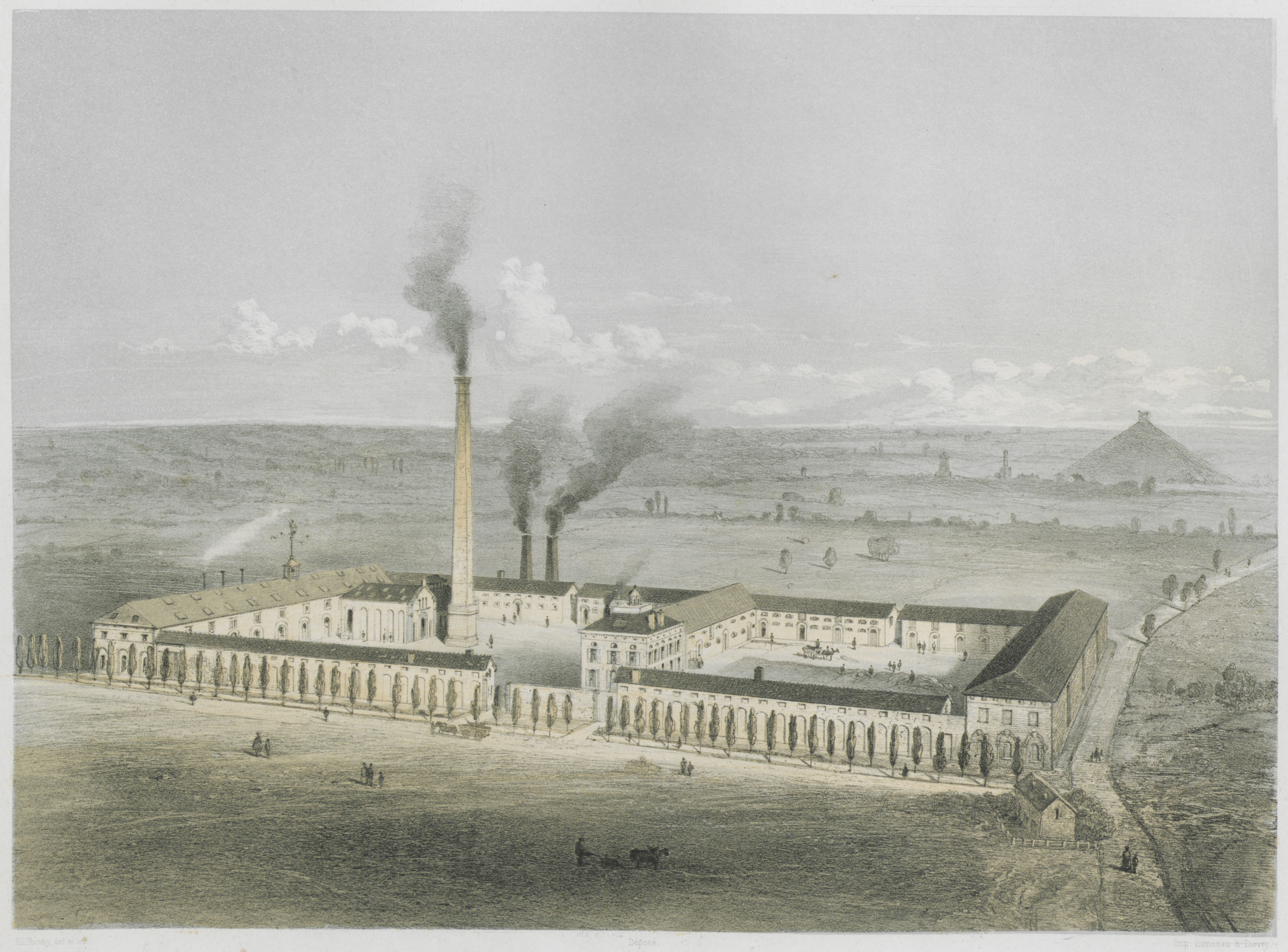
- In La Belgique industrielle by Edwin Toovey c. 1855 In the background the Lion's Mound
- Industry: Sugar manufacturing
- Founded: 1836
- Defunct: 1871 (the factory)
- Headquarters: Waterloo, Belgium
- Products: raw beet sugar

The Waterloo sugar factory is a former sugar factory in Waterloo, in the south of the former Province of Brabant in Belgium. The building was a sugar factory from 1836 to 1871. Later it was used by a dairy company. The industrial area is now known as Waterloo Office Park.

== S.A. Raffinerie Nationale du Sucre indigène et exotique ==
After the 1830-1831 Belgian Revolution, the Dutch import of raw cane sugar from Java was redirected from Antwerp to ports in the northern Netherlands. As the new state found itself without any colonies, it was very much interested in the process of making raw sugar from sugar beet.

Only a few years after the Belgian independence, the Brussels haute finance gathered round the Société Générale took the initiative to found a beet sugar factory in rural Waterloo, a big village that lived from agriculture and forestry. On 19 January 1836 the S.A. Raffinerie Nationale du Sucre indigène et exotique was founded. Its seat was at the Sugar refinery Quai-au-Foin no. 31 in Brussels. There were 4,000 shares of 1,000 francs. Shareholders were:

- P.F.J. Meeûs (1792-1867), former sugar refiner as biggest shareholder.
- C.F. Claes de Lembecq
- F.X. Rittweger, banker
- P.J. Meeûs-Vandermaelen (1793-1873) former sugar refiner, 121 shares
- C. Lecocq, 1,760 shares together with Hamoir De Reus and Moyard-Dugardin
- V.M. Hamoir-De Reus beet sugar manufacturer from Valenciennes.
- P.J. Moyard-Dugardin from Lille

The name Raffinerie Nationale du Sucre indigène et exotique was pretentious, but it fit size of the capital of 4,000,000 Belgian Francs, which was huge at the time. The stated goal of the company was the refining of raw cane- and beet sugar, growing sugar beet, and being active in the associated industries. The associated industries saw to using byproducts for feeding cattle, and for producing alcohol.

To achieve all this, the company got four parts. A sugar refinery at Quai-au-Foin no. 31 in Brussels was brought in by P.J. Meeûs-Vandermaelen. Three large plots of ground totaling 700 hectares were brought in by the managing-directors Hamoir-De Reus and Moyard-Dugardin and the manager Lecocq. They had bought these parts of the Sonian Forest from Société Générale in 1835 and 1836. For bringing these lands to the company they got 1,775 shares.

The 700 hectares were lands that would be deforested. On one plot of land, the sugar factory would be built. On the others, at Sint-Genesius-Rode the farms Boesdaalhoeve and Sint-Gertrudishoeve were built to cultivate sugar beet in rotation with other crops.

The first stone for the sugar factory was set on 29 April 1836, and in 1837 construction was complete. It was a neoclassical complex of 220 by 80.5 m, consisting of buildings surrounding two equivalent courts divided by a building with a house for the management.

Construction used red-purple brick, stone and oak beams for the ceilings. The house for the management was the central Maison aux lions, which also held the offices. Behind it in the same separating wing were the stables.

From an auction announcement, we know that the factory had some modern manufacturing and refining equipment: steam engines, pumps, filters, evaporators, vacuum pans, defecating machines, etc. all from red copper. The company also had a sugar distillery according to the Blumenthal system.

The essential problem of the factory was the choice of location. It had not been chosen for there being suitable ground for sugar beet in the area, or that there were farmers willing to grow them. While Waterloo was on a good road, it lacked good access to water, which at the time was essential to transport beet in an economical way. Obviously, the only grounds to build at Waterloo was that the location was near the domicile of Count Ferdinand de Meeûs (1798-1861), president of Société Générale, who lived at the nearby Château d'Argenteuil. He tried to get production going at Waterloo, but did not succeed.

The company was a total disaster. In 1844 it was already putting up the farms and much of the grounds for auction. On 1 January 1845 the auction of the 'factory and refinery' was announced. In July 1845 the company went into liquidation.

The sale of the sugar factory at Waterloo proved very difficult. Even in September 1850 it was still advertized. By then the price asked for the buildings and 27 hectares of land was down to 125,000 francs. On 18 February 1851, the liquidation was completed. The shareholders received a final payment of 53 francs 11 centimes per share.

== Sucrerie de Waterloo ==
In October 1850, a group of merchants from Antwerp bought the buildings of the Raffinerie Nationale. In November 1851 the company 'Sucrerie de Waterloo' got permission to found a factory for the manufacture of beet sugar and bone char, as well as a gas factory to light the buildings.

In 1851 the sugar factory was taken into use again, but on a very limited scale. In 1852 it would also restart the refinery, which was planned to be a year-round activity.

A Mr. François Capouillet was largely responsible for the restart of the factory. He belonged to one of the great families of Belgian sugar refineries and manufacturers. He was mayor of Waterloo from 1861 to 1873. In spite of this, he could not make a success out of the company. In 1871 the new company went into liquidation, because the areas where the cultivation of sugar beet was successful were too far away. The connection of Waterloo to the railways in 1874 came too late.

== Bone char from the Waterloo dead ==
In sugar refining, bone char was, and still is, used during purification to decolorize the melted sugar liquor. It also removes colloidal material and a considerable amount of ash. Shortly before 1815 the idea to use bone char instead of charcoal for refining colonial cane sugar and manufacturing sugar from beet. This caught on quickly, but as the industry was using it on a throw away basis, there soon was a shortage of bones. In 1828 Dumont introduced a method for using granulated bone char, and a revivification process. This revivification of course came at some cost, and led to some deterioration, putting a practical limit on the amount of bone char that could be used.

After the 1815 Battle of Waterloo tens of thousands of men and horses were hastily buried on the battlefield. By 2022 it was already known that human and animal bones had been dug up at Waterloo and on other European battlefields and sent to the United Kingdom to be ground and used as fertilizer. At the time, people were not that shocked about this practice. It was later superseded by more efficient fertilizers.

A far more cruel idea was that the bones of the soldiers might have been used to make bone char at the local sugar factory or elsewhere. This theory has now been generally accepted. Indeed, there were many incidents where bones were illegally exhumed, sometimes at the pretense of exhuming horses.

== Later companies using the buildings ==
In 1871, the buildings were sold to S.A. Waterloo Dairy and Brussels Poultry Company. This factory occupied the buildings till 1907. It was led by I. van Montenaeken and produced condensed milk under vacuum. In 1907 the buildings were sold to a Mr. van Volsem, who tried to found a factory for natural rubber.

From 1908 to 1926 the buildings were part of a farm owned by Count de Meeus d'Argenteuil. In 1929 he was followed by the architect Otto, later by a sheep farm and a lot of other occupants. Next some projects by the municipality and the French Community of Belgium ended in failure.

== Current use ==
In 1989 the project developer Louis de Waele acquired the buildings to establish offices, retail shops and a hotel. This led to a renovation of the buildings and some new buildings. In 1992 Europay International was one of the companies that moved into the buildings.
