= Sylvain Waserman =

French politician

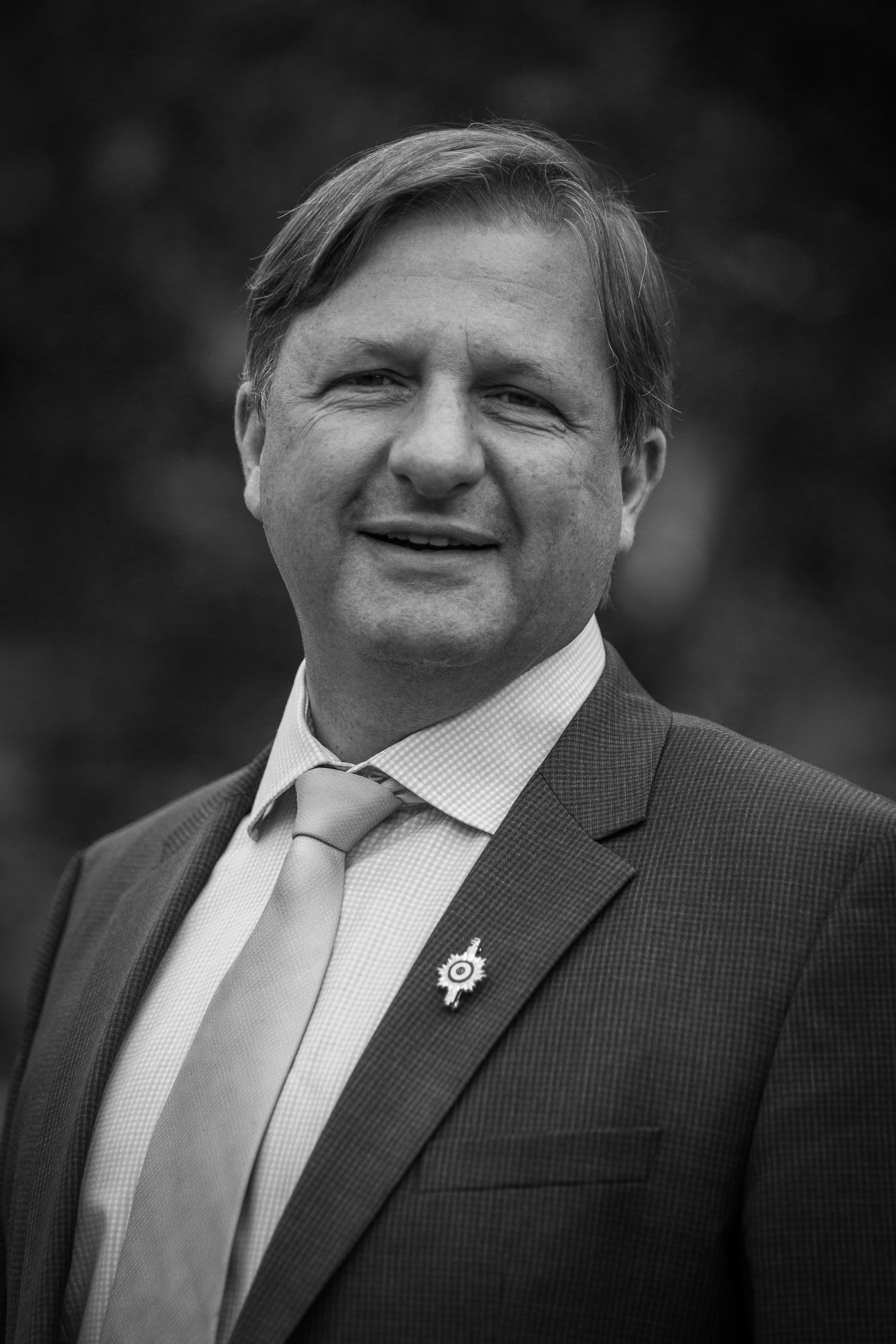

Member of the National Assembly for Bas-Rhin's 2nd constituency
- In office 21 June 2017 – 21 June 2022
- Preceded by: Philippe Bies
- Succeeded by: Emmanuel Fernandes

Personal details
- Born: 8 December 1967 (age 58) Paris, France
- Party: La République En Marche!

Sylvain Waserman (born 8 December 1967) is a French politician of La République En Marche! (LREM) who served as a member of the French National Assembly from 2017 to 2022, representing the department of Bas-Rhin's 2nd constituency.

== Political career ==
In parliament, Waserman was a member of the Committee on Foreign Affairs from 2017 until 2018 before moving to the Committee on Legal Affairs. In this capacity, he notably served as rapporteur on a revision of the National Assembly's rules of procedure (2019) and revised rules on lobbying. He also serves as chairman of the French-Austrian Parliamentary Friendship Group and is a member of the French-Turkish Parliamentary Friendship Group.

In addition to his role in parliament, Waserman served as member of the French delegation to the Parliamentary Assembly of the Council of Europe since 2017. He is part of the Alliance of Liberals and Democrats for Europe group and serves on the Committee on Legal Affairs and Human Rights as well as on the Sub-Committee on the implementation of judgments of the European Court of Human Rights. Since 2019, he has been the Assembly's rapporteur on the protection of whistleblowers.

He lost his seat in the 2022 French legislative election to Emmanuel Fernandes from La France Insoumise.

== Political positions ==
In July 2019, Waserman voted in favor of the French ratification of the European Union’s Comprehensive Economic and Trade Agreement (CETA) with Canada.

== See also ==
- 2017 French legislative election
