= Château de Drulingen =

Château in Bas-Rhin, Alsace, France

Coordinates: 48°51′58″N 7°11′21″E

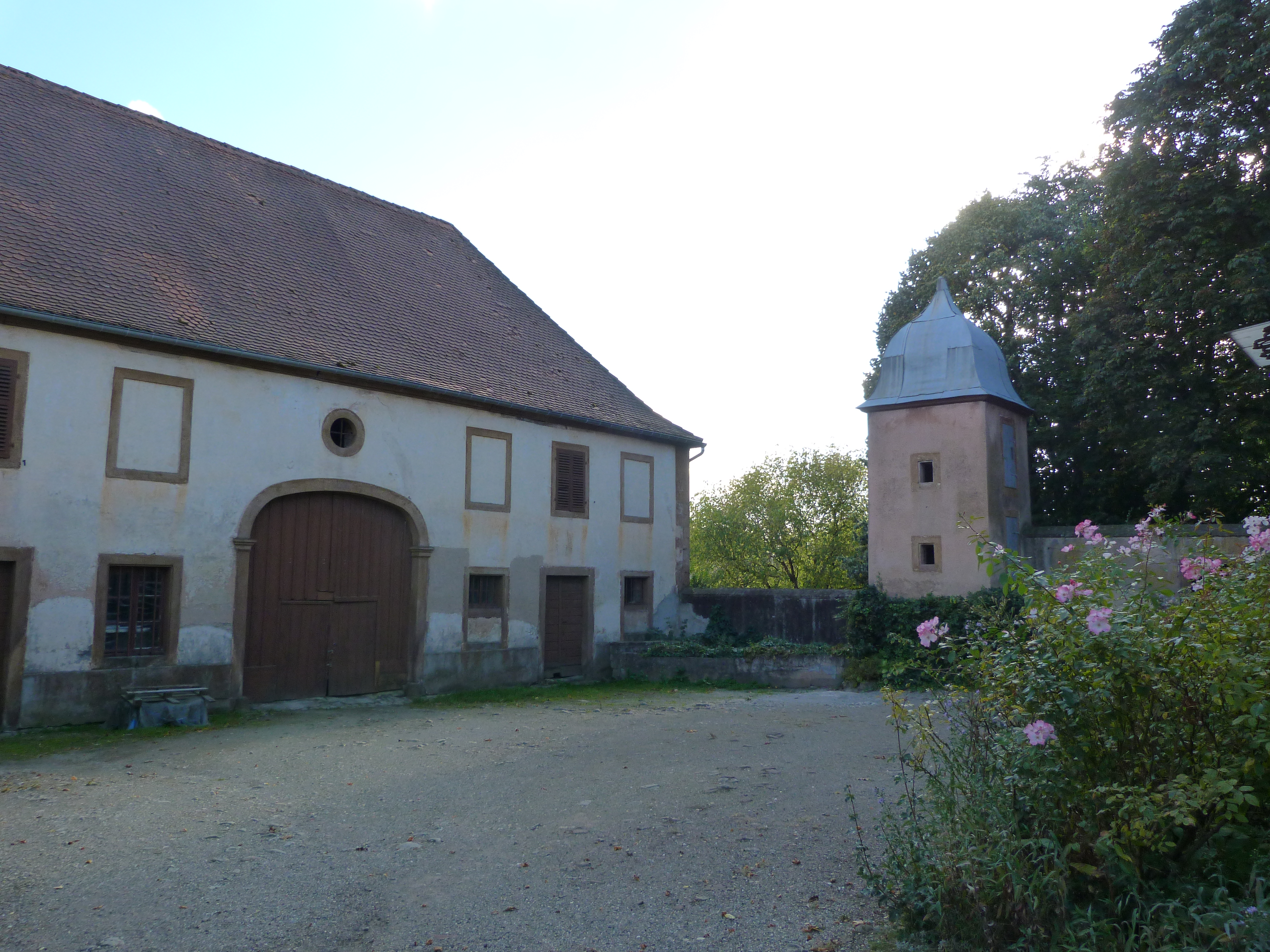
Château de Drulingen

Château de Drulingen is a château in Drulingen, Bas-Rhin, Alsace, France. The building was built in 1816 by Jean Schmidt (1775–1844) upon his return from the Napoleonic Wars. It became a monument historique on 16 July 1987.
