= Bruno Studer =

French politician (born 1978)

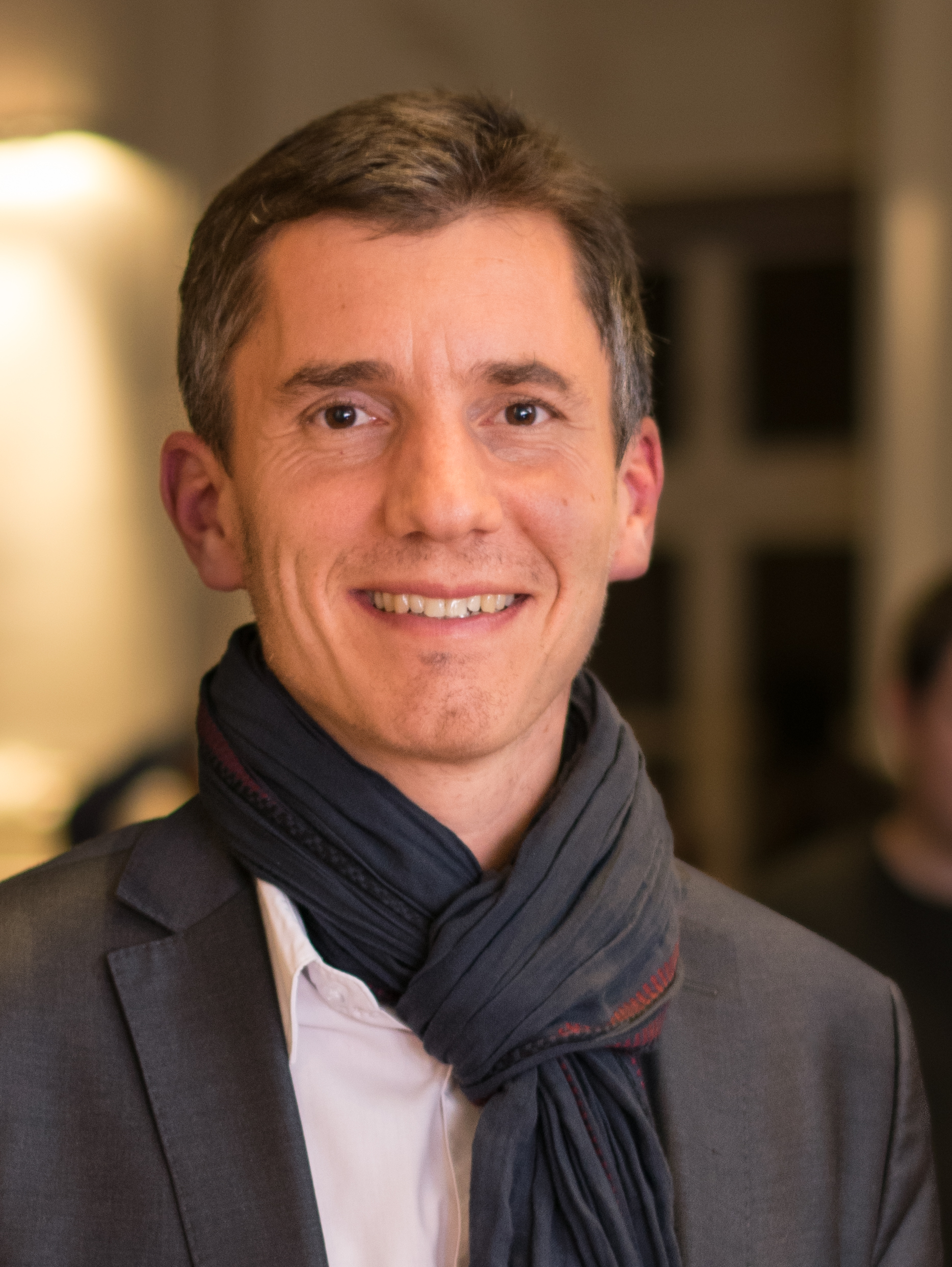

Member of the National Assembly for Bas-Rhin's 3rd constituency
- In office 21 June 2017 – 9 June 2024
- Preceded by: André Schneider
- Succeeded by: Thierry Sother

Personal details
- Born: 18 June 1978 (age 48) Colmar, France
- Party: Renaissance (2016–present)
- Other political affiliations: Union of Democrats and Independents (formerly)
- Education: Artois University

Bruno Studer (born 18 June 1978) is a French teacher and politician who represented the 3rd constituency of Bas-Rhin in the National Assembly from 2017 to 2024. He is a member of Renaissance (RE, formerly La République En Marche!) which he joined in 2016.

== Early career ==
A native of Colmar, Studer worked as a history and geography teacher in Liverdun, Leverkusen (Germany), Metz and Strasbourg.

== Political career ==
Studer was a member of the Union of Democrats and Independents (UDI) before joining La République En Marche! (LREM) in 2016. He headed En Marche (later LREM) in Strasbourg. In Parliament, Studer served as chairman of the Committee on Cultural Affairs and Education from 2017 to 2022. From 2019 to 2022, he was also a member of the French delegation to the Franco-German Parliamentary Assembly; from 2022 to 2024, he was a member of the French delegation to the Parliamentary Assembly of the Council of Europe.

In 2018, Studer was tasked with drafting a bill designed to stop manipulation of information in the run-up to elections. He also served as rapporteur on bills regulating child labour on YouTube (2020), harmonising parental control systems offered by internet service providers (2021), as well as protecting children's rights to their own images (2023).

== Other activities ==
- France Télévisions, Member of the Supervisory Board (2017–2022)

== See also ==
- List of MPs who lost their seat in the 2024 French legislative election
