= Asswiller =

- Commune
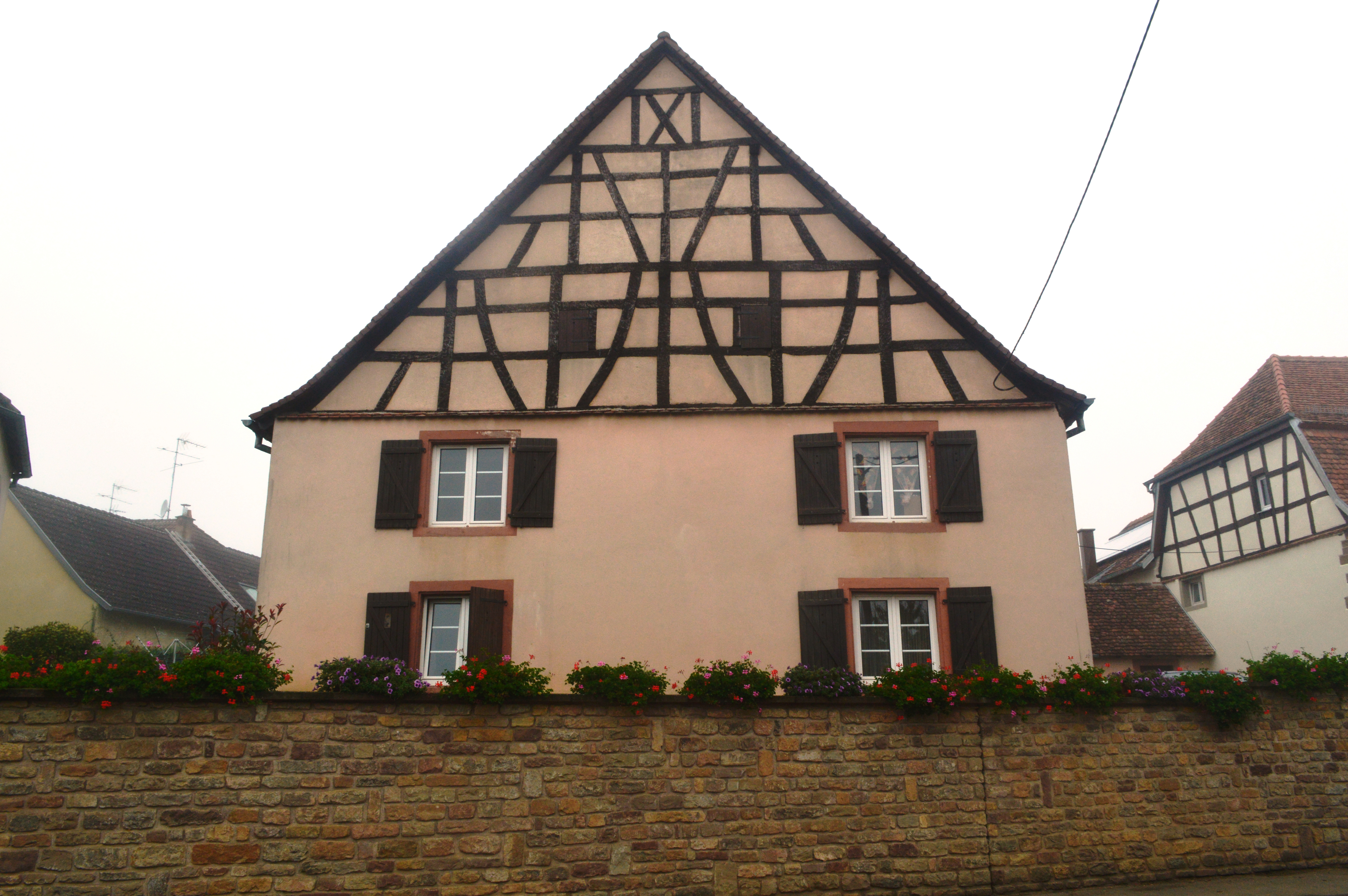
- An old house in Asswiller

- Coat of arms
- Location of Asswiller
- Location within France Location within Grand Est
- Coordinates: 48°52′55″N 7°13′15″E
- Country: France
- Region: Grand Est
- Department: Bas-Rhin
- Arrondissement: Saverne
- Canton: Ingwiller
- Intercommunality: CC Alsace Bossue

Government
  - Mayor (2020–2026): Norbert Stammler
- Area^{1}: 6.02 km^{2} (2.32 sq mi)
- Highest elevation: 337 m (1,106 ft)
- Lowest elevation: 256 m (840 ft)
- Population (2023): 268
  - Density: 44.5/km^{2} (115/sq mi)
- Time zone: UTC+01:00 (CET)
  - Summer (DST): UTC+02:00 (CEST)
- INSEE/Postal code: 67013 /67320
- ^{1} French Land Register data, which excludes lakes, ponds, glaciers > 1 km^{2} (0.386 sq mi or 247 acres) and river estuaries.

Asswiller (French pronunciation: [asvilɛʁ]; German: Aßweiler) is a commune in the Bas-Rhin department in the Grand Est region of north-eastern France.

The commune has been awarded one flower by the National Council of Towns and Villages in Bloom in the Competition of cities and villages in Bloom.

== Geography ==
Asswiller is in the Northern Vosges Regional Natural Park some 27 km south-east of Sarralbe and 38 km south-west of Bitche. Access to the commune is by the D9 road from Durstel in the north-west, passing through the heart of the commune and the village and continuing south-east to Petersbach. The D309 road goes south-west from the village to Drulingen. There is a large forest in the west with strips of forest along the borders with the remainder of the commune's farmland.

The Isch forms the south-western boundary of the commune as it flows west to eventually join the Sarre west of Wolfskirchen. The Ottwillergraben forms the eastern border of the commune as it flows north to join the Eichel at Tieffenbach.

== Toponymy ==
- 718: Asco vilare
- 1793: Asveiller
- 1801: Asswiler

In German the commune name is Aßweiler.

== History ==
Asswiller was a small lordship dependent on the Counts of La Petite-Pierre. When the count palatine of Bavaria, Georg Johann I of Bavaria, took possession of the county, he granted Asswiller as a hereditary fief to the Dalheim family (1588), who were soon succeeded by the Steinkallenfels family: senior officials of the palatine counts. These Protestant lords introduced the Reformation and remained in Asswiller from the 16th century to 1819. In 1789 Asswiller belonged to the Lord of Carbiston who had acquired it in 1771 by marriage with the heiress of the Steincallenfels family.

After the French Revolution Asswiller was attached to France in 1793 by decree of the National Convention, which overrode the rights of princes holding possessions.

=== Heraldry ===
Arms of Asswiller	Blazon: Party per fesse, first of Vert a lion passant guardant of Argent, second of Or.

== Administration ==
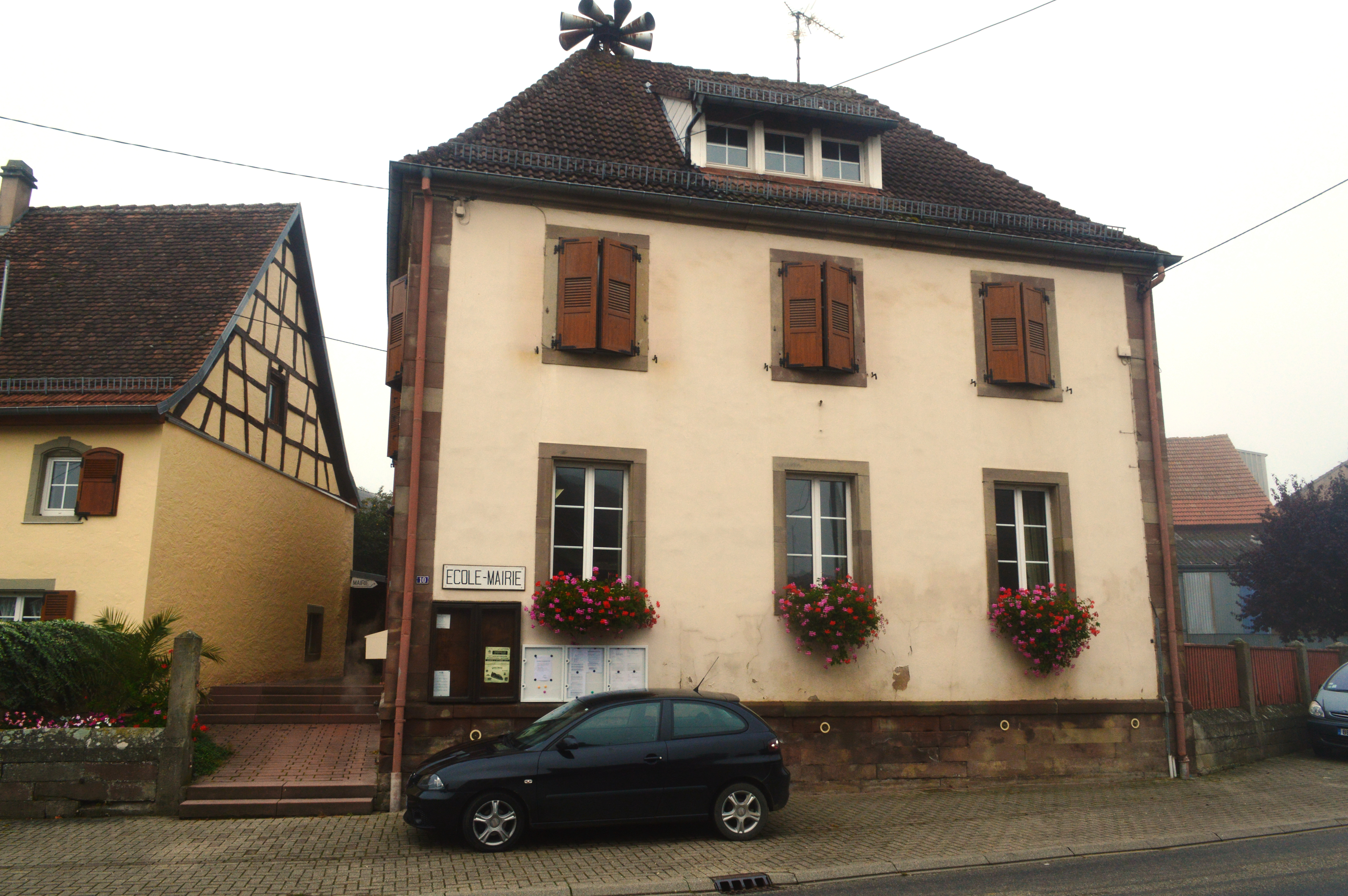
The Town Hall

List of Successive Mayors

From	To	Name	Party	Position
2001	2008	Jean Mathia	UMP	General Councillor
2008	2026	Norbert Stammler		

== Demography ==
The inhabitants of the commune are known as Asswillerois or Asswilleroises in French.

Historical population

Year	Pop.	±% p.a.
1793	326	—
1821	411	+0.83%
1846	402	−0.09%
1871	351	−0.54%
1900	335	−0.16%
1926	276	−0.74%
1946	251	−0.47%
1962	223	−0.74%
1968	238	+1.09%

Year	Pop.	±% p.a.
1975	225	−0.80%
1982	218	−0.45%
1990	215	−0.17%
1999	230	+0.75%
2007	269	+1.98%
2012	292	+1.65%
2017	276	−1.12%
2023	268	−0.49%

Source: EHESS and INSEE

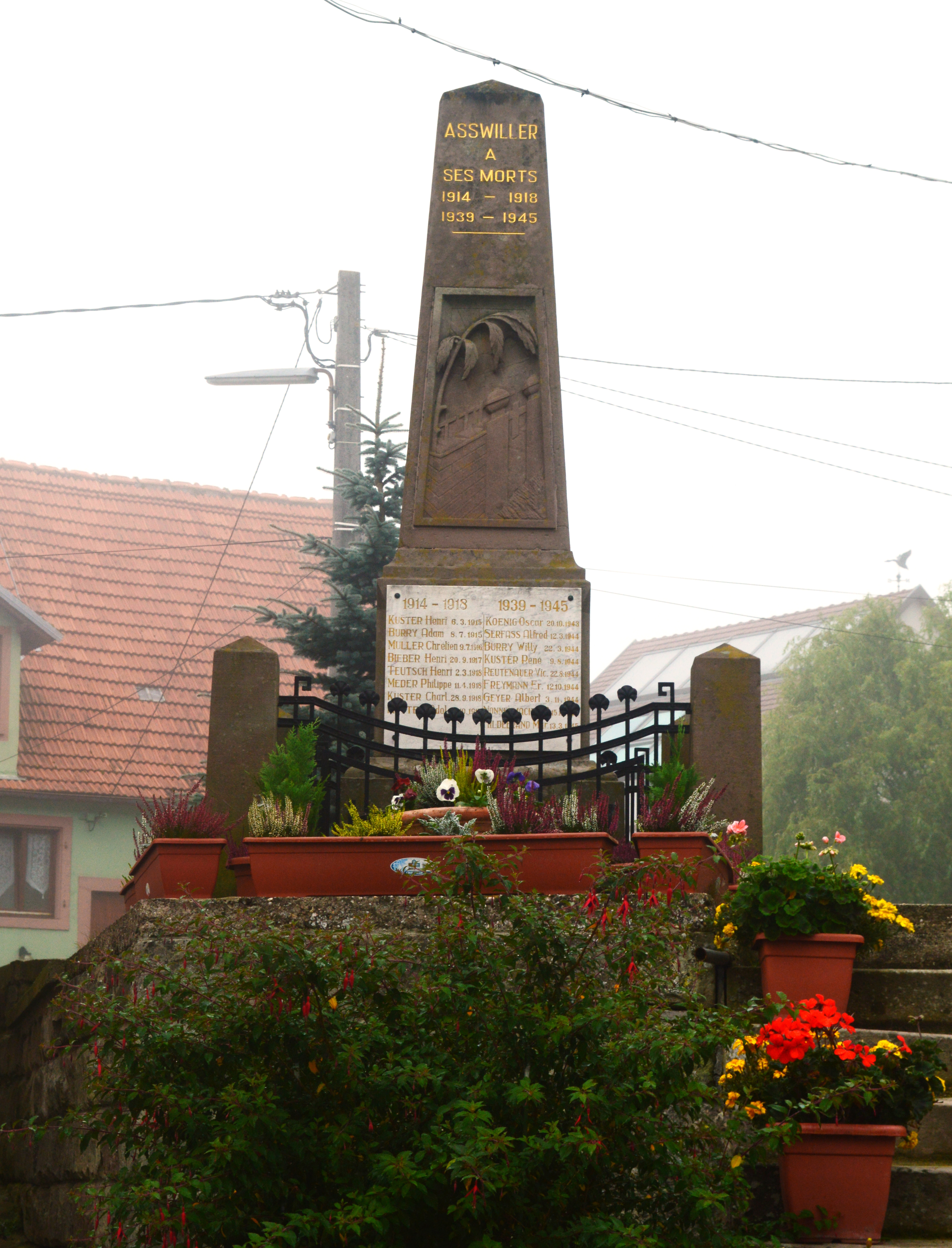
Asswiller War Memorial

== Culture and heritage ==
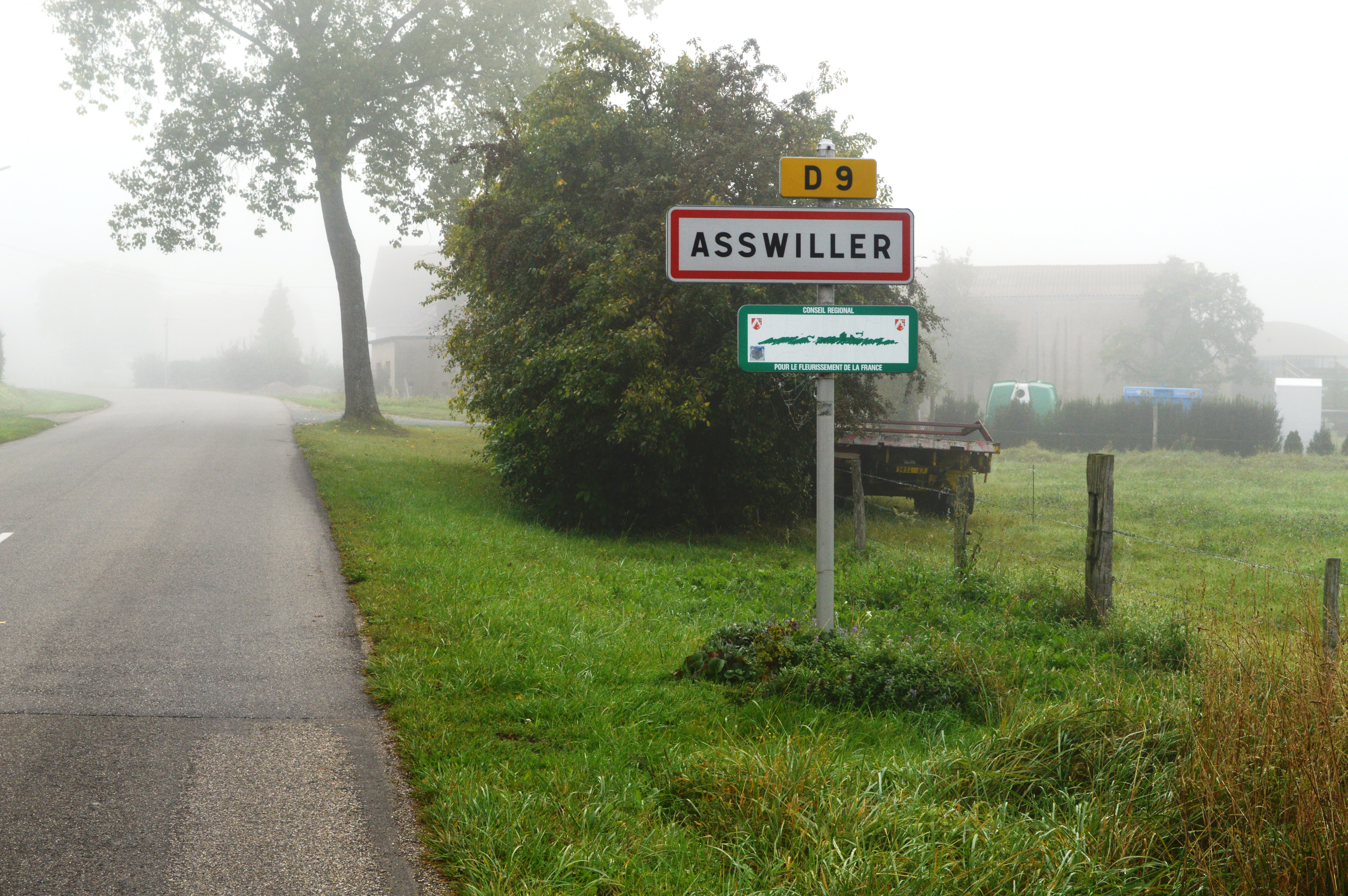
The entry to Asswiller

=== Civil heritage ===
Many buildings and structures in Asswiller are registered as historical monuments:

- A Farmhouse at 2 Rue du Cimetière (1775)
- A Chateau at 6 Rue de Drulingen (13th century)
- The Town Hall/School at 10 Rue de Durstel (19th century)
- A Farmhouse at 18 Rue de Durstel (20th century)
- A Courthouse at 2 Rue de Durstel (1733)
- A Farmhouse at 26 Rue de Durstel (1861)
- A Farmhouse at 5 Rue de Durstel (19th century)
- A Farmhouse at 5 Bis Rue de Durstel (1761)
- A Farmhouse at 14 Rue de Petersbach (1803)
- A Farmhouse at 8 Rue de Petersbach (18th century)
- A Mill called Jaegermuhle (1833)

=== Religious heritage ===
Several religious buildings and structures are registered as historical monuments:

- A Cemetery at Rue du Cimetière (19th century)
- A Protestant Church at Rue de Durstel (1776)
- A Protestant Presbytery at 4 Rue de Durstel (18th century)
- A Lutheran Church at Rue de l'Eglise (1724)

The Cemetery contains two items that are registered as historical objects:

- The Rauscher family tomb (1924)
- 3 Sculptures

The Lutheran Church contains two items that are registered as historical objects:

- The Furniture in the church
- The Organ (1864)

=== Gallery of Historical Monuments ===
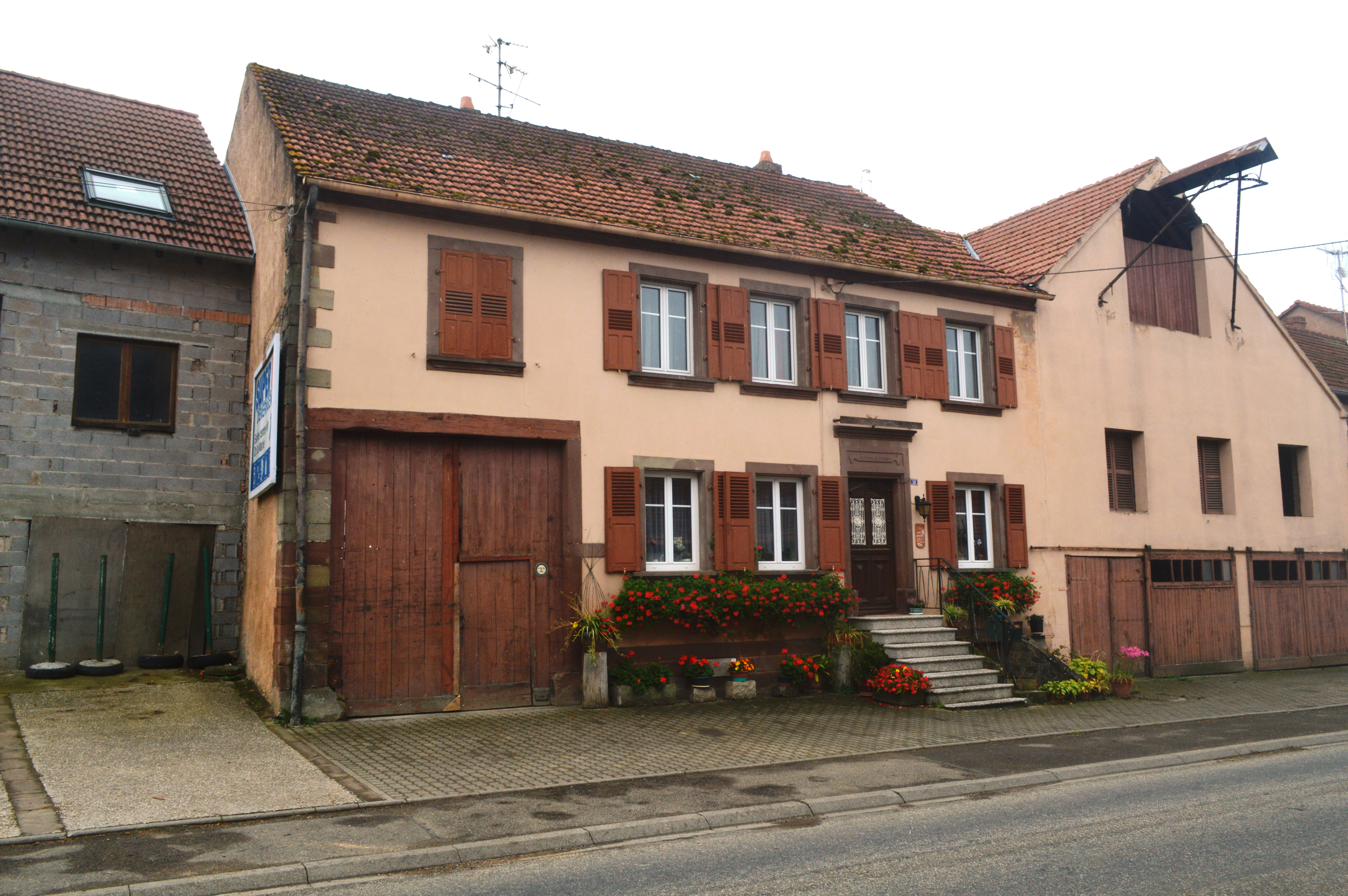
The Farmhouse at 18 Rue de Durstel

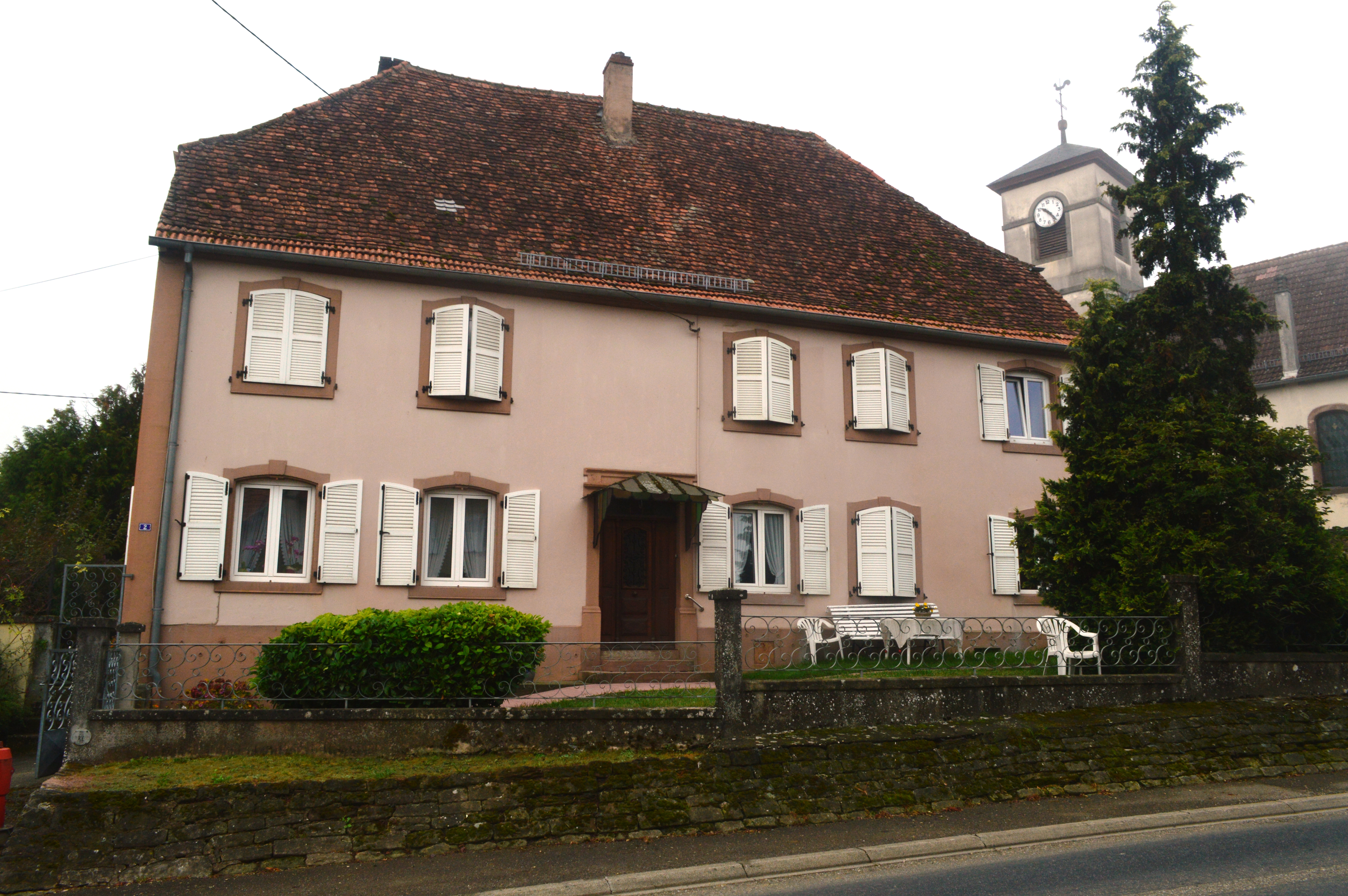
The old Courthouse at 2 Rue de Durstel

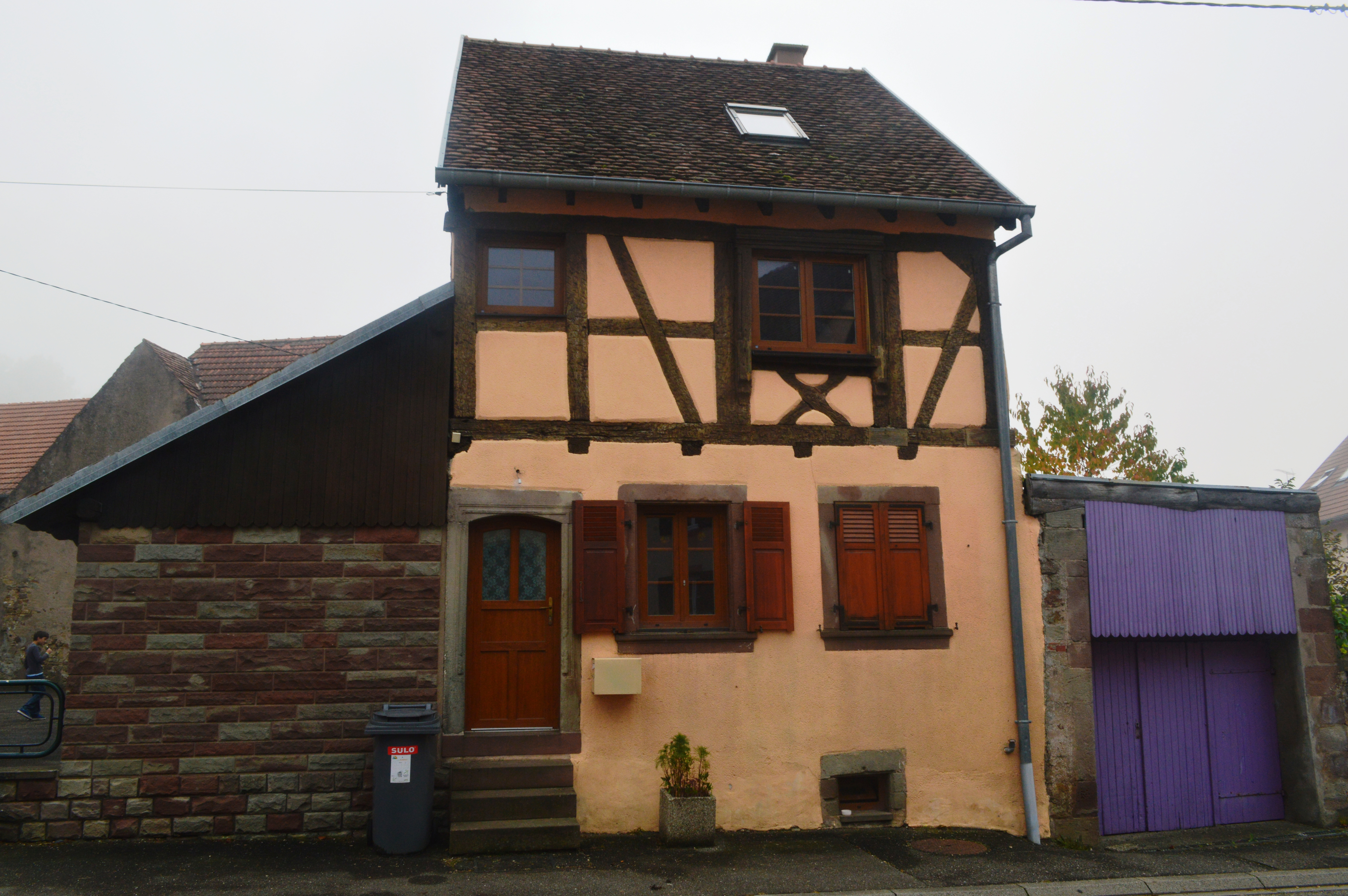
An old house in Asswiller

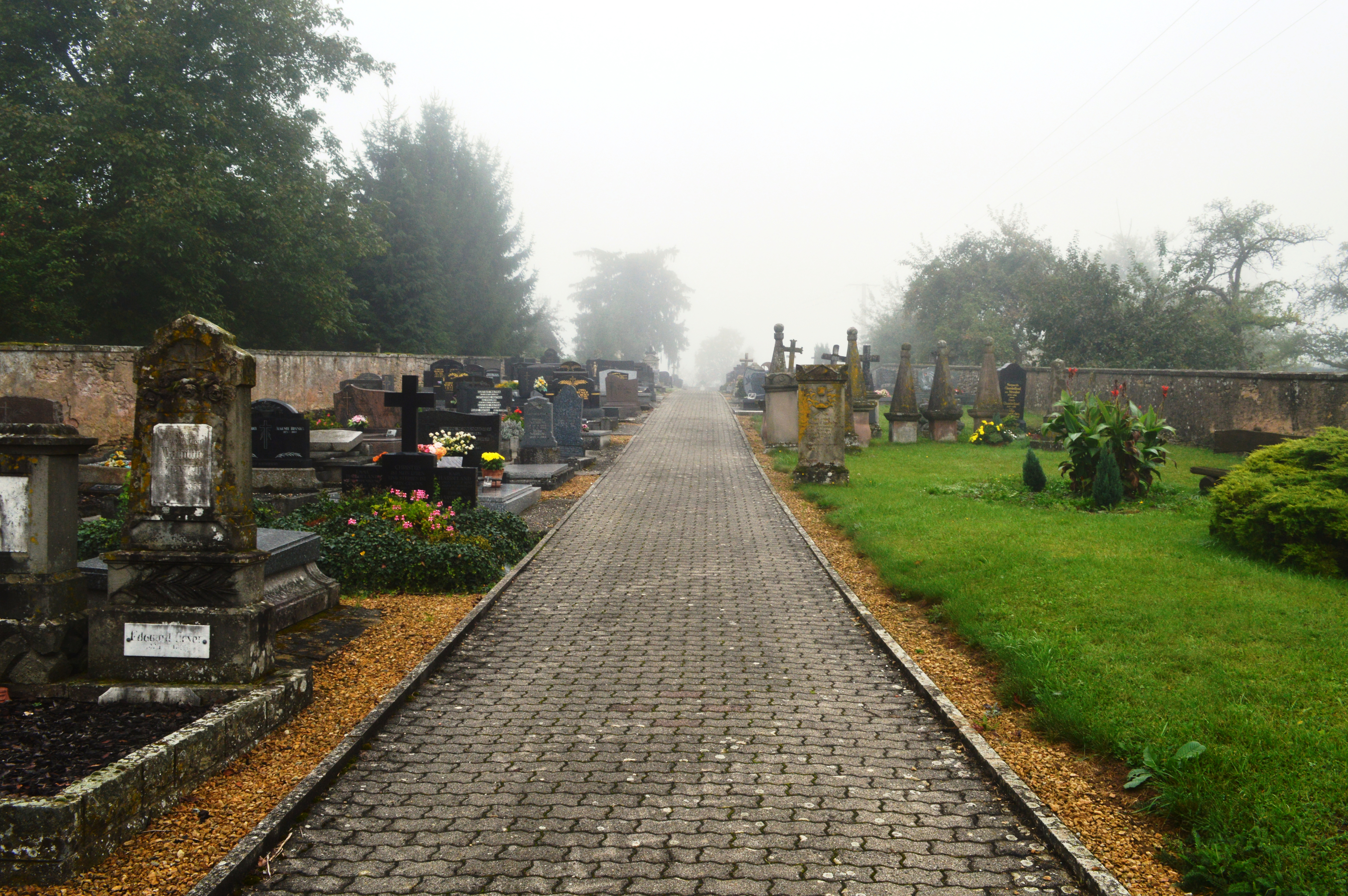
Asswiller Cemetery

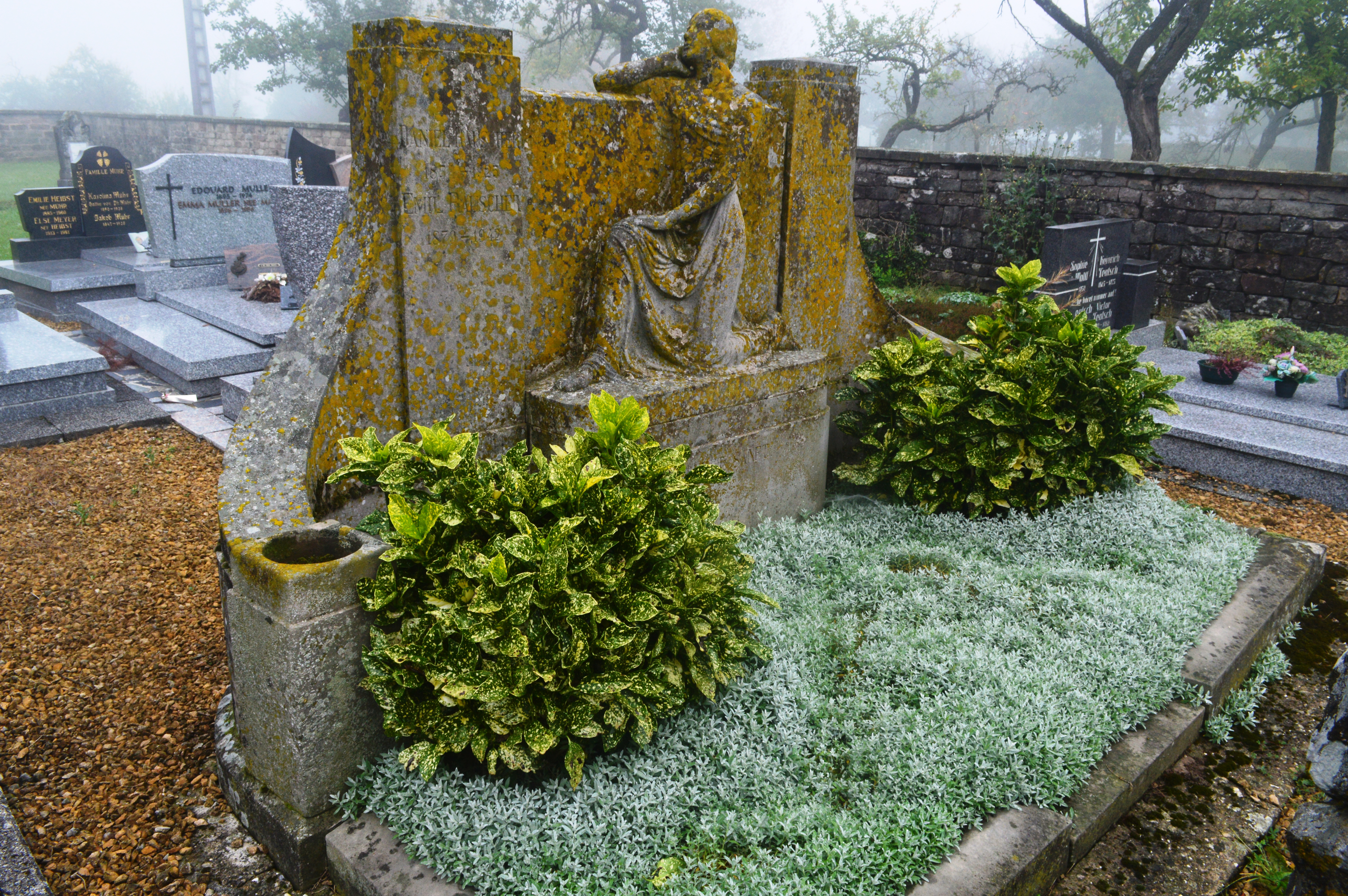
The Rauscher Family Tomb

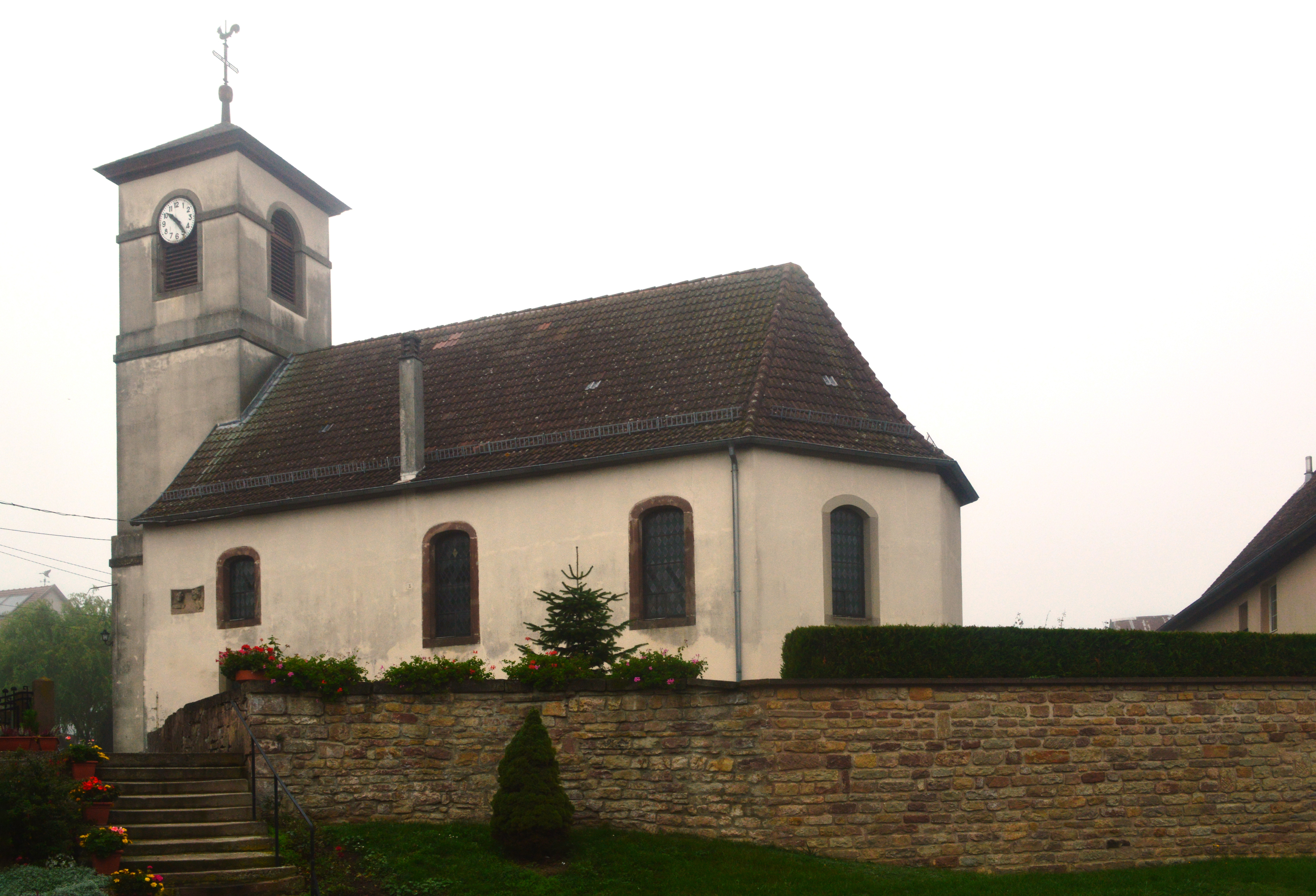
The Protestant Church

== See also ==
- Communes of the Bas-Rhin department
