= Thierry Sother =

French politician (born 1982)

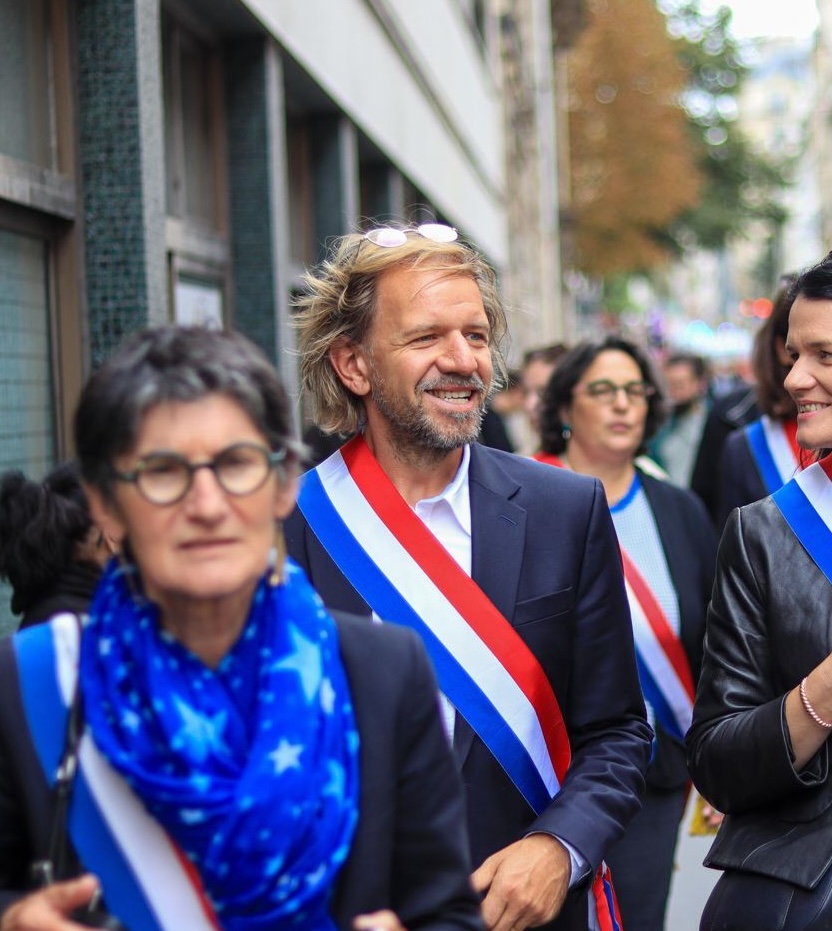
- Sother in 2024

Member of the French National Assembly for Bas-Rhin's 3rd constituency
- Incumbent
- Assumed office 18 July 2024
- Preceded by: Bruno Studer

Personal details
- Born: 2 February 1982 (age 44)
- Party: Socialist Party
- Other political affiliations: New Popular Front

Thierry Sother (born 2 February 1982) is a French politician of the Socialist Party who was elected member of the National Assembly for Bas-Rhin's 3rd constituency in 2024. He was a member of the city council of Mulhouse from 2008 to 2020, and has served as first secretary of the Socialist Party in Bas-Rhin since 2021.

== Early career ==
At the age of 18, Thierry Sother joined the Socialist Party (PS).

In 2004, after earning a bachelor’s degree in contemporary history at Marc Bloch University in Strasbourg and a master’s degree in political communication in Paris, he ran as a candidate on the regional councilor Jacques Bigot’s Socialist Party list. The list secured 34.6% of the votes in the second round. Following his victory, Sother served as the coordinator for the Socialist and Green elected officials’ intergroup at the Regional Council of Grand Est from 2004 to 2007.

For fourteen years, Sother held the position of administrator and head of communications for the Compagnie des Rives de l’Ill, a professional theater company.

== Political career ==
Thierry Sother’s political journey began in earnest in 2008, when he was elected as a Socialist opposition municipal councilor in Mulhouse after his involvement with the Young Socialist Movement (MJS). He was re-elected to the position in 2014, where he served as an assessor with responsibilities for supporting businesses in their real estate projects and establishing a business property observatory.

In 2021, Sother was elected First Secretary of the Socialist Party for the Bas-Rhin department, winning 61.45% of the vote against regional councilor Linda Ibiem, who secured 38.55%.

During the 2024 French legislative election, Sother achieved a significant milestone by winning the seat for the Bas-Rhin's 3rd constituency in the National Assembly. He garnered 43.27% of the vote in a three-way runoff against incumbent MP Bruno Studer of the Ensemble coalition (32.46%) and the National Rally candidate Stéphanie Dô (24.27%).

== Parliamentary Work ==
=== Sport and public health ===
In November 2024, Thierry Sother proposed the creation of a Pass’Sport universel, funded by a tax on sugary products, energy drinks, and advertisements for processed sugary foods. The initiative aimed to expand sports access for children, framing it as both a public health measure and a means to sustain the legacy of the 2024 Paris Summer Olympics. The proposal was adopted on December 4, 2024.

=== Ukraine invasion ===
On geopolitical matters, Sother has been a vocal supporter of Ukraine. In 2025, he participated in a parliamentary mission to Ukraine alongside four other French lawmakers to assess the humanitarian and socio-economic impact of the conflict on local populations.

=== Social Media regulation ===
In June 2025, alongside MP Jérémie Iordanoff, Sother co-authored a European resolution proposal advocating for stricter regulation of social media platforms to combat foreign interference, particularly on X (formerly Twitter). The resolution, which called for the European Union to enforce sanctions on non-compliant platforms, was adopted by a large majority in the French National Assembly.

=== Mobility and Franco-German cooperation ===
In 2025, Sother opposed the elimination of subsidies for overnight trains connecting Paris to Berlin and Paris to Vienna, routes that would have bypassed Strasbourg. His advocacy highlighted the importance of maintaining these connections for regional cooperation.

=== Road safety ===
A year after the death of cyclist Paul Varry, a member of Paris en selle, who was fatally struck in Paris, Sother, alongside MP Florence Hérouin-Léautey, introduced a bill to improve the sharing of public space. The proposal aimed to enhance safety for cyclists and pedestrians.
