= Bas-Rhin's 2nd constituency =

Constituency of the National Assembly of France

2nd constituency of the Bas-Rhin
- inline Constituency of the National Assembly of France

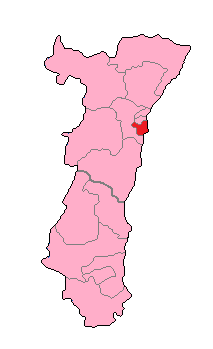
- Bas-Rhin's 2nd Constituency shown within Alsace.

- Bas-Rhin in France
- Deputy: Emmanuel Fernandes; LFI
- Department: Bas-Rhin
- Cantons: Strasbourg III, Strasbourg VII, Strasbourg VIII, Strasbourg X, Illirch-Graffenstaden (part)
- Registered voters: 71,163

The 2nd constituency of the Bas-Rhin is a French legislative constituency in the Bas-Rhin département.

== Description ==
The constituency includes the southern and eastern suburbs of Strasbourg stretching to the border with Germany. The majority of the seat is contained within the town of Strasbourg, however it also contains a substantial portion of the Commune of Illkirch-Graffenstaden. Three of the five cantons are held by the PS. Parties of the right have generally held the seat during the Fifth Republic, however the PS has captured the seat on two occasions most recently in 2012. After being won by the centrist LREM party in 2017, it was gained by the left-wing LFI as part of the NUPES alliance in 2022.

== Historic Representation ==
| Election | Member | Party |
|---|---|---|
| 1958 | André Bord | UNR |
| 1962 | André Bord | UNR |
| 1967 | André Bord | UDR |
| 1968 | André Bord | UDR |
| 1973 | André Bord | UDR |
| 1978 | André Bord | UDR |
| 1981 | Jean Oehler | PS |
| 1986 | Proportional representation - no election by constituency | |
| 1988 | Marc Reymann | UDF |
| 1993 | Marc Reymann | UDF |
| 1997 | Marc Reymann | UDF |
| 2002 | Marc Reymann | UMP |
| 2007 | Jean-Philippe Maurer | UMP |
| 2012 | Philippe Bies | PS |
| 2017 | Sylvain Waserman | LREM |
| 2017 | Sylvain Waserman | MoDem |
| 2022 | Emmanuel Fernandes | LFI |
| 2024 | Emmanuel Fernandes | LFI |

== Election results ==
=== 2024 ===
Legislative Election 2024: Bas-Rhin's 2nd constituency
| Party | Candidate | Votes | % | ±% |
|---|---|---|---|---|
| DIV | Fabienne Schnitzler | 473 | 0.96 | N/A |
| Volt | Elisa Clolot | 358 | 0.73 | N/A |
| DVE | Jean-Marc Governatori | 685 | 1.40 | −0.82 |
| LFI (NFP) | Emmanuel Fernandes | 21,533 | 43.91 | +7.02 |
| LR | Alexandre Wolf-Samaloussi | 3,287 | 6.70 | +0.32 |
| LO | Alain Richard | 262 | 0.53 | N/A |
| MoDem (Ensemble) | Rebecca Breitman | 11,063 | 22.56 | −7.75 |
| NPA | Clement Soubise | 154 | 0.31 | N/A |
| RN | Virginie Joron | 10,407 | 21.22 | +9.75 |
| UL | Cendrine Diemunsch | 819 | 1.67 | −0.68 |
| Turnout | | 49,041 | 98.62 | +50.75 |
| Registered electors | | 72,992 | | |
2nd round result
| LFI | Emmanuel Fernandes | 24,089 | 48.79 | +4.88 |
| MoDem | Rebecca Breitman | 13,962 | 28.28 | +5.72 |
| RN | Virginie Joron | 11,326 | 22.94 | +1.72 |
| Turnout | | 49,377 | 98.16 | +50.91 |
| Registered electors | | 73,016 | | |
| LFI hold | | Swing | | |

=== 2022 ===
Legislative Election 2022: Bas-Rhin's 2nd constituency
| Party | Candidate | Votes | % | ±% |
|---|---|---|---|---|
| LFI (NUPÉS) | Emmanuel Fernandes | 12,785 | 36.89 | +6.60 |
| MoDem (Ensemble) | Sylvain Waserman | 10,506 | 30.31 | -4.75 |
| RN | Hombeline du Parc | 3,977 | 11.47 | −2.40 |
| LR (UDC) | Alexandre Wolf Samaloussi | 2,211 | 6.38 | −0.04 |
| REC | Nelly Caminade | 916 | 2.64 | N/A |
| PRG | Thibaut Vinci | 857 | 2.47 | N/A |
| UL (REG) | Cendrine Diemunsch | 813 | 2.35 | −1.41 |
| DVE | Fabienne Schnitzler | 768 | 2.22 | +1.13 |
| Others | N/A | 1,826 | - | − |
| Turnout | | 34,659 | 47.87 | −0.02 |
2nd round result
| LFI (NUPÉS) | Emmanuel Fernandes | 16,990 | 51.23 | +9.76 |
| MoDem (Ensemble) | Sylvain Waserman | 16,174 | 48.77 | −9.76 |
| Turnout | | 33,164 | 47.25 | +8.14 |
| LFI gain from LREM | | | | |

=== 2017 ===
Results of the 11 June and 18 June 2017 French National Assembly election in Bas-Rhin's 2nd Constituency
| Candidate | Party | | 1st round | | 2nd round | |
| Candidate | Party | | Votes | % | Votes | % |
|---|---|---|---|---|---|---|
| Sylvain Waserman | La République En Marche! | LREM | 11,539 | 35.06 | 14,492 | 58.53 |
| Philippe Bies | Socialist Party | PS | 4,209 | 12.79 | 10,268 | 41.47 |
| Christine Kaidi | La France Insoumise | FI | 4,040 | 12.28 | | |
| Jean-Philippe Maurer | Miscellaneous Right | DVD | 3,596 | 10.93 | | |
| Julia Abraham | National Front | FN | 2,986 | 9.07 | | |
| Pascale Jurdant-Pfeiffer | Union of Democrats and Independents | UDI | 2,113 | 6.42 | | |
| Leyla Binici | Ecologist | ECO | 1,424 | 4.33 | | |
| Alexandre Spinner | Regionalist | REG | 1,238 | 3.76 | | |
| Selen Yagmur Ayyildiz | Independent | DIV | 425 | 1.29 | | |
| Fabienne Schnitzler | Ecologist | ECO | 360 | 1.09 | | |
| Marie-Pierre Ponpon | Communist Party | PCF | 292 | 0.89 | | |
| Alain Carnesecca | Independent | DIV | 207 | 0.63 | | |
| Mehmet Caglar | Independent | DIV | 185 | 0.56 | | |
| Yann Lucas | Far Left | EXG | 175 | 0.53 | | |
| Saad Brahimi | Independent | DIV | 123 | 0.37 | | |
| Total | | | 32,912 | 100% | 24,760 | 100% |
| Registered voters | | | 69,535 | | 69,535 | |
| Blank/Void ballots | | | 385 | 1.15% | 2,438 | 8.97% |
| Turnout | | | 33,297 | 47.89% | 27,198 | 39.11% |
| Abstentions | | | 36,238 | 52.11% | 42,337 | 60.89% |
| Result | | | | | REM GAIN FROM PS | |

=== 2012 ===
Results of the 10 June and 17 June 2012 French National Assembly election in Bas-Rhin's 2nd Constituency
| Candidate | Party | | 1st round | | 2nd round | |
| Candidate | Party | | Votes | % | Votes | % |
|---|---|---|---|---|---|---|
| Philippe Bies | Socialist Party | PS | 13,983 | 37.62 | 18,791 | 52.25 |
| Jean-Philippe Maurer | Union for a Popular Movement | UMP | 12,652 | 34.04 | 17,173 | 47.75 |
| Xavier Codderens | National Front | FN | 4,611 | 12.41 | | |
| Eric Schultz | Europe Ecology - The Greens | EELV | 2,268 | 6.10 | | |
| Antoine Splet | Left Front | FG | 1,561 | 4.10 | | |
| Pascale Tussing | The Centre for France | CEN | 848 | 2.28 | | |
| Dimitri Breiner | Other | AUT | 416 | 1.12 | | |
| Jean-Baptiste Caillat | Miscellaneous Right | DVD | 283 | 0.76 | | |
| Aurélien Dumez | Far Left | EXG | 189 | 0.51 | | |
| Roland Robert | Far Left | EXG | 143 | 0.38 | | |
| Patrick Saule | Other | AUT | 110 | 0.30 | | |
| Elisabeth Del Grande | Far Left | EXG | 102 | 0.27 | | |
| Total | | | 37,166 | 100% | 35,964 | 100% |
| Registered voters | | | 71,162 | | 71,163 | |
| Blank/Void ballots | | | 323 | 0.86% | 764 | 2.08% |
| Turnout | | | 37,489 | 52.68% | 36,728 | 51.61% |
| Abstentions | | | 33,673 | 47.32% | 34,435 | 48.39% |
| Result | | | | | PS GAIN FROM UMP | |

=== 2007 ===
Results of the 10 June and 17 June 2007 French National Assembly election in Bas-Rhin's 2nd Constituency
| Candidate | Party | | 1st round | | 2nd round | |
| Candidate | Party | | Votes | % | Votes | % |
|---|---|---|---|---|---|---|
| Jean-Philippe Maurer | Union for a Presidential Majority | UMP | 10,797 | 38.87 | 13,211 | 51.32 |
| Philippe Bies | Socialist Party | PS | 7,100 | 25.56 | 12,530 | 48.68 |
| Pascale Jurdant-Pfeiffer | UDF-Democratic Movement | UDF-MoDem | 3,799 | 13.68 | | |
| Yann Wehrling | The Greens | LV | 1,642 | 5.91 | | |
| Xavier Codderens | National Front | FN | 1,248 | 4.53 | | |
| Francis Lalanne | Ecologist | ECO | 975 | 3.51 | | |
| Jean-Baptiste Metz | Communist Party | PCF | 413 | 1.49 | | |
| Mohamed Er Rachidi | Independent | DIV | 334 | 1.20 | | |
| Philippe Morel | Far Left | EXG | 273 | 0.98 | | |
| François-Joseph Mayer | Independent | DIV | 220 | 0.79 | | |
| Roland Robert | Far Left | EXG | 214 | 0.77 | | |
| Géraldine Grün Nevers | Miscellaneous Right | DVD | 206 | 0.74 | | |
| Patrick Beaufrere | Miscellaneous Right | DVD | 151 | 0.54 | | |
| Armand Tenesso | Independent | DIV | 137 | 0.49 | | |
| Valérie Broussolle | Far Left | EXG | 101 | 0.36 | | |
| Michèle Depret | Miscellaneous Left | DVG | 79 | 0.28 | | |
| François Bunner | Independent | DIV | 77 | 0.28 | | |
| Total | | | 27,776 | 100% | 25,741 | 100% |
| Registered voters | | | 52,296 | | 51,496 | |
| Blank/Void ballots | | | 256 | 0.91% | 585 | 2.22% |
| Turnout | | | 28,032 | 53.60% | 26,326 | 51.12% |
| Abstentions | | | 24,264 | 46.40% | 25,170 | 48.88% |
| Result | | | | | UMP HOLD | |

=== 2002 ===
Results of the 9 June and 16 June 2002 French National Assembly election in Bas-Rhin's 2nd Constituency
| Candidate | Party | | 1st round | | 2nd round | |
| Candidate | Party | | Votes | % | Votes | % |
|---|---|---|---|---|---|---|
| Marc Reymann | Union for a Presidential Majority | UMP | 11,104 | 38.99 | 13,134 | 50.52 |
| Roland Reis | Socialist Party | PS | 9,509 | 33.39 | 12,863 | 49.48 |
| Robert Spieler | Far Right | EXD | 3,656 | 12.84 | | |
| Christine Panzer | The Greens | LV | 1,148 | 4.03 | | |
| J. Claude Petitdemange | Miscellaneous Left | DVG | 1,036 | 3.64 | | |
| Gregory Bisiaux | Miscellaneous Left | DVG | 501 | 1.76 | | |
| Francois Bunner | Republican Pole | PR | 310 | 1.09 | | |
| J. Baptiste Metz | Communist Party | PCF | 287 | 1.01 | | |
| M. Claude Richez | Revolutionary Communist League | LCR | 258 | 0.91 | | |
| Valerie Broussole | Far Left | EXG | 244 | 0.86 | | |
| Roland Robert | Workers' Struggle | LO | 214 | | | |
| J. Yves Rognon | Independent | DIV | 141 | 0.50 | | |
| Alexis Dubois | Independent | DIV | 72 | 0.25 | | |
| Total | | | 28,480 | 100% | 25,997 | 100% |
| Registered voters | | | 48,370 | | 48,372 | |
| Blank/Void ballots | | | 350 | 1.21% | 602 | 2.26% |
| Turnout | | | 28,830 | 59.60% | 26,599 | 54.99% |
| Abstentions | | | 19,540 | 40.40% | 21,773 | 45.01% |
| Result | | | | | UMP GAIN FROM UDF | |

== Sources ==
Official results of French elections from 2002: "Résultats électoraux officiels en France" (in French).
