= Arrondissements of the Bas-Rhin department =

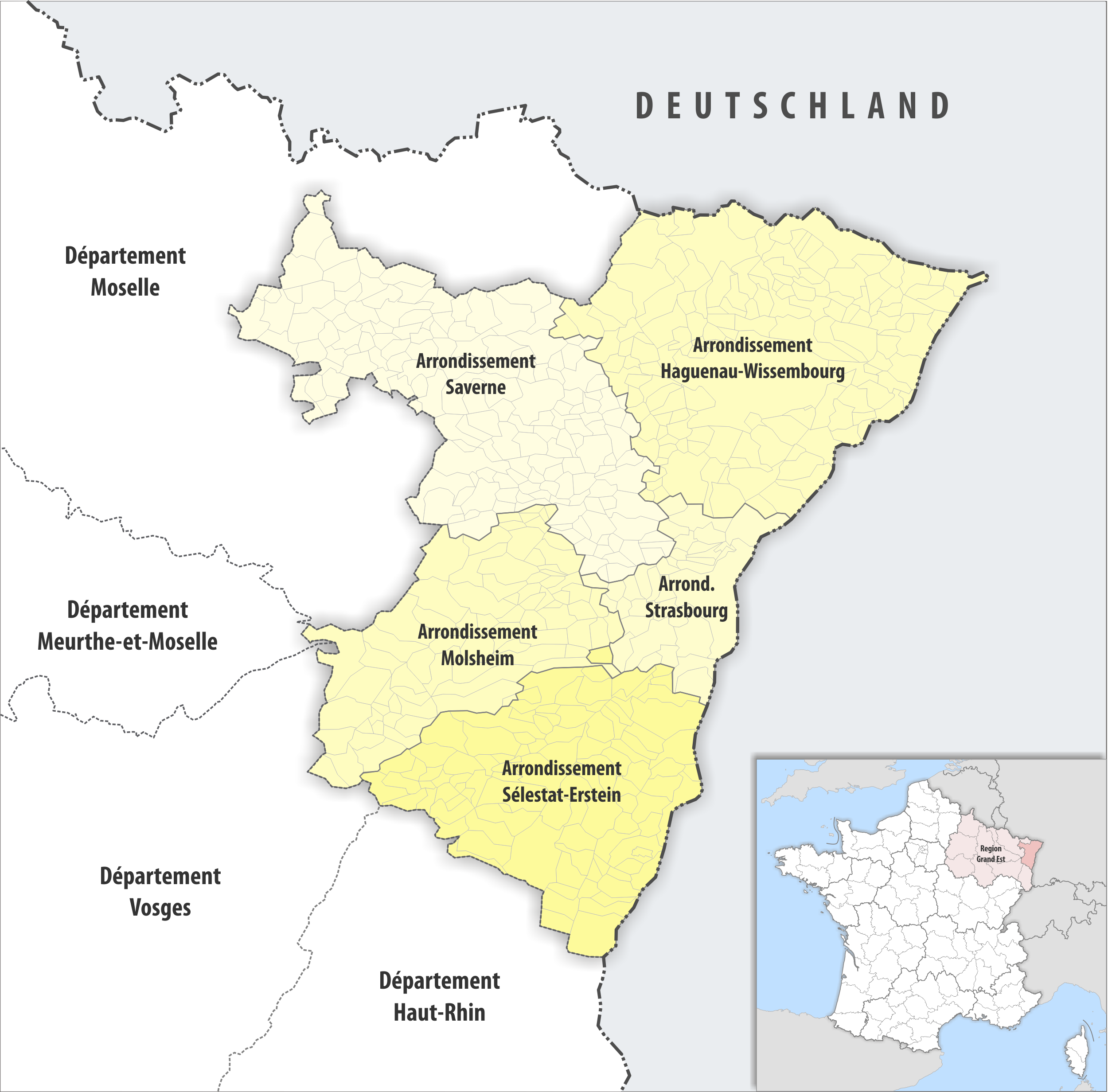
Map of arrondissements of the Bas-Rhin department.

The five arrondissements of the Bas-Rhin department are:

1. Arrondissement of Haguenau-Wissembourg, (subprefecture: Haguenau) with 141 communes. The population of the arrondissement was 244,304 in 2021.
2. Arrondissement of Molsheim, (subprefecture: Molsheim) with 77 communes. The population of the arrondissement was 104,391 in 2021.
3. Arrondissement of Saverne, (subprefecture: Saverne) with 162 communes. The population of the arrondissement was 129,666 in 2021.
4. Arrondissement of Sélestat-Erstein, (subprefecture: Sélestat) with 101 communes. The population of the arrondissement was 159,650 in 2021.
5. Arrondissement of Strasbourg, (prefecture of the Bas-Rhin department: Strasbourg) with 33 communes. The population of the arrondissement was 514,651 in 2021.

== History ==
In 1800 the arrondissements of Strasbourg, Barr, Saverne and Wissembourg were established. In 1806 Sélestat replaced Barr as subprefecture. In 1871 the department was ceded to Germany. In 1919 the department of Bas-Rhin was restored, with the arrondissements of Strasbourg-Ville, Strasbourg-Campagne, Erstein, Haguenau, Molsheim, Saverne, Sélestat and Wissembourg. In 1974 the arrondissements of Erstein and Sélestat were merged into the new arrondissement of Sélestat-Erstein.

The borders of the arrondissements of Bas-Rhin were modified in January 2015:

- all 56 communes of the former arrondissement of Haguenau to the new arrondissement of Haguenau-Wissembourg
- two communes from the arrondissement of Saverne to the new arrondissement of Haguenau-Wissembourg
- seven communes from the arrondissement of Saverne to the arrondissement of Molsheim
- 18 communes of the former arrondissement of Strasbourg-Campagne to the new arrondissement of Haguenau-Wissembourg
- one commune of the former arrondissement of Strasbourg-Campagne to the arrondissement of Molsheim
- 53 communes of the former arrondissement of Strasbourg-Campagne to the arrondissement of Saverne
- 32 communes of the former arrondissement of Strasbourg-Campagne to the new arrondissement of Strasbourg
- the only commune of the former arrondissement of Strasbourg-Ville to the new arrondissement of Strasbourg
- all 68 communes of the former arrondissement of Wissembourg to the new arrondissement of Haguenau-Wissembourg
