= Bas-Rhin's 3rd constituency =

Constituency of the National Assembly of France

3rd constituency of the Bas-Rhin
- inline Constituency of the National Assembly of France

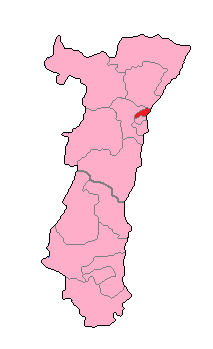
- Bas-Rhin's 3rd Constituency shown within Alsace

- Bas-Rhin in France
- Deputy: Thierry Sother; PS
- Department: Bas-Rhin
- Cantons: Strasbourg V, Strasbourg VI, Bischheim, Schiltigheim, Mundolsheim (part)
- Registered voters: 68,329

The 3rd constituency of the Bas-Rhin is a French legislative constituency in the Bas-Rhin département.

== Description ==
Bas-Rhin's 3rd Constituency includes the northern suburbs of the city of Strasbourg. Control of the cantons that make up the constituency was split between UMP and PS through to the early 2010s, a fact reflected in the close margin of victory for André Schneider at the 2012 election. In 2017, the PS vote collapsed here as elsewhere, with their candidate coming 4th in the first round with only 6.4% of the vote.

== Historic representation ==
Election	Member	Party
1986	Proportional representation – no election by constituency	
1988	Jean Oehler	PS
1993	Alfred Muller	DVG
1997	André Schneider	UMP
2002	André Schneider	UMP
2007	André Schneider	UMP
2012	André Schneider	UMP
2017	Bruno Studer	LREM
2022	Bruno Studer	RE
2024	Thierry Sother	PS

== Election results ==
=== 2024 ===
Legislative Election 2024: Bas-Rhin's 3rd constituency
Party	Candidate	Votes	%	±%
DIV	Camille Robert	0	0.00	N/A
DIV	Mohamed Sylla	294	0.64	N/A
DVE	Thierry Parat	782	1.71	−2.77
DVG	Hicham Hamza	112	0.24	N/A
Volt	Félix Kleimann	129	0.28	N/A
LR	Dera Ratsiajetsinimaro	1,760	3.85	−1.64
LO	Denise Grandmougin	252	0.55	N/A
PS (NFP)	Thierry Sother	17,355	37.94	N/A
RN	Stéphanie Dô	10,567	23.10	+9.46
REC	Alexandre Zyzeck	420	0.92	−1.78
RE (Ensemble)	Bruno Studer	13,260	28.99	−5.76
UL	Gautier Perrin	813	1.78	−1.48
Turnout		45,744	98.44	+52.72
Registered electors		70,945		
2nd round result
PS	Thierry Sother	20,150	43.27	+5.33
RE	Bruno Studer	15,115	32.46	+3.47
RN	Stéphanie Dô	11,302	24.27	+1.17
Turnout		46,567	98.24	+5.84
Registered electors		70,961		
PS gain from RE				

=== 2022 ===
Legislative Election 2022: Bas-Rhin's 3rd constituency
Party	Candidate	Votes	%	±%
LREM (Ensemble)	Bruno Studer	11,123	34.75	-4.75
LFI (NUPÉS)	Sébastien Mas	9,864	30.82	+5.91
RN	Stéphanie Dô	4,309	13.46	+4.51
LR (UDC)	Imene Sfaxi	1,758	5.49	−11.11
DVE	Chantal Cutajar	1,433	4.48	N/A
UL (REG)	Capucine Gautheron	1,044	3.26	−1.45
REC	Joëlle Gaubert	864	2.70	N/A
Others	N/A	1,613	-	−
Turnout		32,008	45.72	−0.53
2nd round result
LREM (Ensemble)	Bruno Studer	16,357	54.53	-5.24
LFI (NUPÉS)	Sébastien Mas	13,642	45.47	N/A
Turnout		29,999	44.40	+6.05
LREM hold				

=== 2017 ===
Results of the 11 June and 18 June 2017 French National Assembly election in Bas-Rhin’s 3rd Constituency
Candidate	Party		1st round		2nd round	
Candidate	Party		Votes	%	Votes	%
Bruno Studer	La République En Marche!	LREM	12,433	39.50	14,337	59.77
Georges Schuler	The Republicans	LR	5,225	16.60	9,648	40.23
Floriane Dupré	La France Insoumise	FI	3,649	11.59		
Diana Garnier-Lang	National Front	FN	2,818	8.95		
Serge Oehler	Socialist Party	PS	2,017	6.41		
Christelle Syllas	Ecologist	ECO	1,852	5.88		
Andrée Munchenbach	Regionalist	REG	1,483	4.71		
Julie Roesch	Independent	DIV	439	1.39		
Salih Caglar	Independent	DIV	374	1.19		
Antoine Splet	Communist Party	PCF	323	1.03		
Lucienne Anthiaume	Debout la France	DLF	282	0.90		
Sylvie Marinet	Independent	DIV	218	0.69		
Xavier Codderens	Far Right	EXD	177	0.56		
Marie-Claire Lechene	Far Left	EXG	160	0.51		
Yves Laybourn	Independent	DIV	24	0.08		
Total			31,474	100%	23,985	100%
Registered voters			68,881		68,885	
Blank/Void ballots			383	1.20%	2,434	9.22%
Turnout			31,857	46.25%	26,419	38.35%
Abstentions			37,024	53.75%	42,466	61.65%
Result					LREM GAIN FROM UMP	

=== 2012 ===
Results of the 10 June and 17 June 2012 French National Assembly election in Bas-Rhin’s 3rd Constituency
Candidate	Party		1st round		2nd round	
Candidate	Party		Votes	%	Votes	%
André Schneider	Union for a Popular Movement	UMP	13,411	38.04	17,310	50.99
Andrée Buchmann	Europe Ecology - The Greens	EELV	12,942	36.71	16,637	49.01
Huguette Fatna	National Front	FN	4,643	13.17		
Marc Baader	Left Front	FG	1,863	5.28		
Mathilde Karceles	The Centre for France	CEN	1,348	3.82		
Matthieu Wiedenhoff	Other	AUT	460	1.30		
Jean-Paul Leonhardt	Miscellaneous Right	DVD	324	0.92		
Marie-Claire Lechene	Far Left	EXG	265	0.75		
Total			35,256	100%	33,947	100%
Registered voters			68,329		68,329	
Blank/Void ballots			402	1.13%	833	2.40%
Turnout			35,658	52.19%	34,780	50.90%
Abstentions			32,671	47.81%	33,549	49.10%
Result					UMP HOLD	

=== 2007 ===
Results of the 10 June and 17 June 2007 French National Assembly election in Bas-Rhin’s 3rd Constituency
Candidate	Party		1st round		2nd round	
Candidate	Party		Votes	%	Votes	%
André Schneider	Union for a Popular Movement	UMP	16,154	47.18	18,154	57.75
Zoubida Naïli	Socialist Party	PS	7,133	20.83	13,284	42.25
Bornia Tarall	UDF-Democratic Movement	UDF-MoDem	3,515	10.27		
Andrée Buchmann	The Greens	LV	1,920	5.61		
Natacha Lugonja	National Front	FN	1,835	5.36		
Mohamed Latreche	Independent	DIV	788	2.30		
Jean-Luc Muller	Far Left	EXG	714	2.09		
Jacques Werchmann	Ecologist	ECO	479	1.40		
Claude Weber	Independent	DIV	473	1.38		
Marie-Claire Lechêne	Far Left	EXG	325	0.95		
Julien Gorrand	Communist Party	PCF	319	0.93		
Dominique Jobredeaux	Independent	DIV	252	0.74		
David Jacquart	Far Right	EXD	216	0.63		
Yasmina Benchohra-Sadarnac	Independent	DIV	113	0.33		
Total			34,236	100%	31,438	100%
Registered voters			66,888		66,888	
Blank/Void ballots			418	1.21%	767	2.38%
Turnout			34,654	51.81%	32,205	48.15%
Abstentions			32,234	48.19%	34,683	51.85%
Result					UMP HOLD	

=== 2002 ===
Results of the 9 June and 16 June 2002 French National Assembly election in Bas-Rhin’s 3rd Constituency
Candidate	Party		1st round		2nd round	
Candidate	Party		Votes	%	Votes	%
André Schneider	Union for a Presidential Majority	UMP	13,172	36.75	19,177	58.33
Catherine Trautmann	Socialist Party	PS	11,461	31.97	13,702	41.67
Xavier Codderens	National Front	FN	4,052	11.30		
Bertrand Hirtz	Union for French Democracy	UDF	2,250	6.28		
Stephane Bourhis	National Republican Movement	MNR	1,318	3.68		
J. Marie Kutner	Miscellaneous Left	DVG	1,085	3.03		
Andree Munchenbach	Ecologist	ECO	1,010	2.82		
J. Claude Meyer	Revolutionary Communist League	LCR	330	0.92		
M. Claire Lechene	Workers’ Struggle	LO	322	0.90		
Claude Leclerc	Communist Party	PCF	293	0.82		
Nicole Plancon	Independent	DIV	193	0.54		
Yasmina Benchohra-Sadarnac	Miscellaneous Right	DVD	155	0.43		
Olivier Valet	Independent	DIV	127	0.35		
Evelyne Gonthier	Independent	DIV	76	0.21		
C. Andre Welschinger	Independent	DIV	0	0.00		
Total			35,844	100%	32,879	100%
Registered voters			61,396		61,396	
Blank/Void ballots			438	1.21%	831	2.47%
Turnout			36,282	59.10%	33,710	54.91%
Abstentions			25,114	40.90%	27,686	45.09%
Result					UMP HOLD	

== Sources ==
Official results of French elections from 2002: "Résultats électoraux officiels en France" (in French).
