= Château de Diedendorf =

Château in Bas-Rhin, Grand Est, France

Coordinates: 48°52′41″N 7°2′49″E

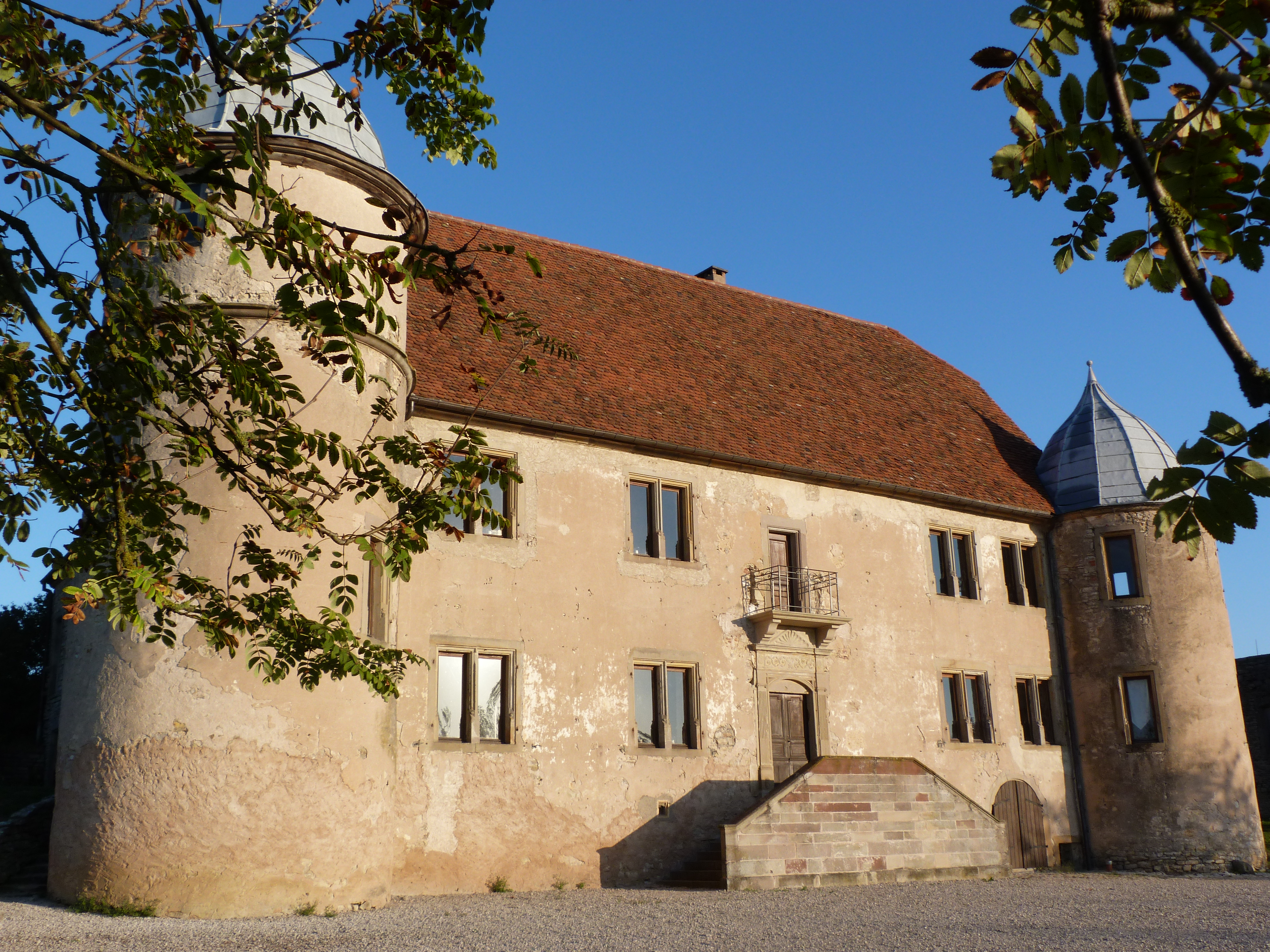
Castle

The Château de Diedendorf is a Renaissance style château situated in the commune of Diedendorf in the département of Bas-Rhin, Grand Est, France.

It was completed in 1580.
