= Emmanuel Fernandes =

French politician (born 1980)

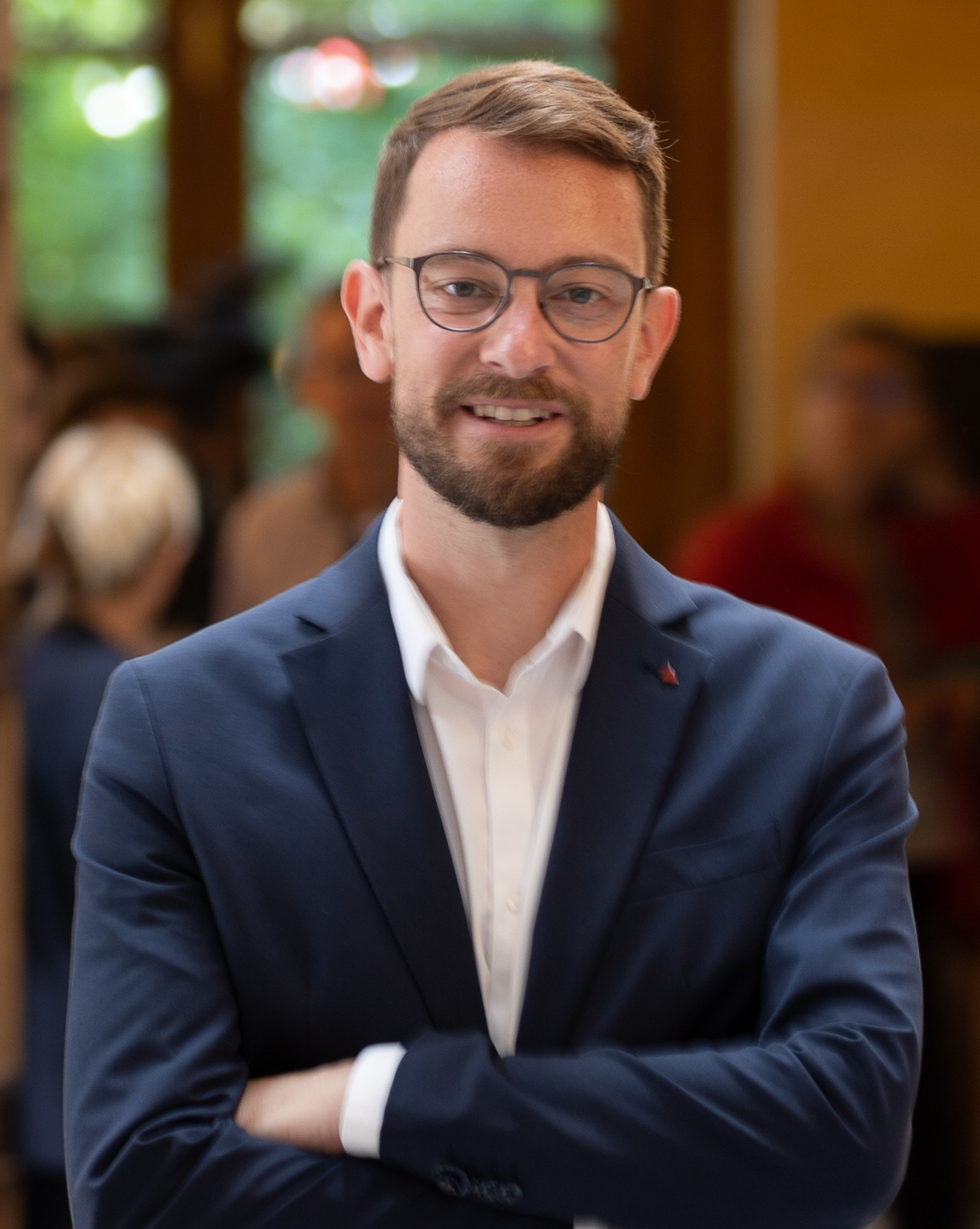

Member of the National Assembly for Bas-Rhin's 2nd constituency
- Incumbent
- Assumed office 22 June 2022
- Preceded by: Sylvain Waserman

Personal details
- Born: 10 August 1980 (age 45) Thann, Haut-Rhin, France
- Party: La France Insoumise (since 2016)
- Other political affiliations: Left Party (2012–2016)

Emmanuel Fernandes (born 10 August 1980) is a French politician of La France Insoumise (NUPES) who has been representing Bas-Rhin's 2nd constituency in the National Assembly since 2022.

== Early life ==
Fernandes was born to a Portuguese father and French mother.

== See also ==
- List of deputies of the 16th National Assembly of France
- List of deputies of the 17th National Assembly of France
