= Drulingen =

Drulingen Drulinge
- Commune
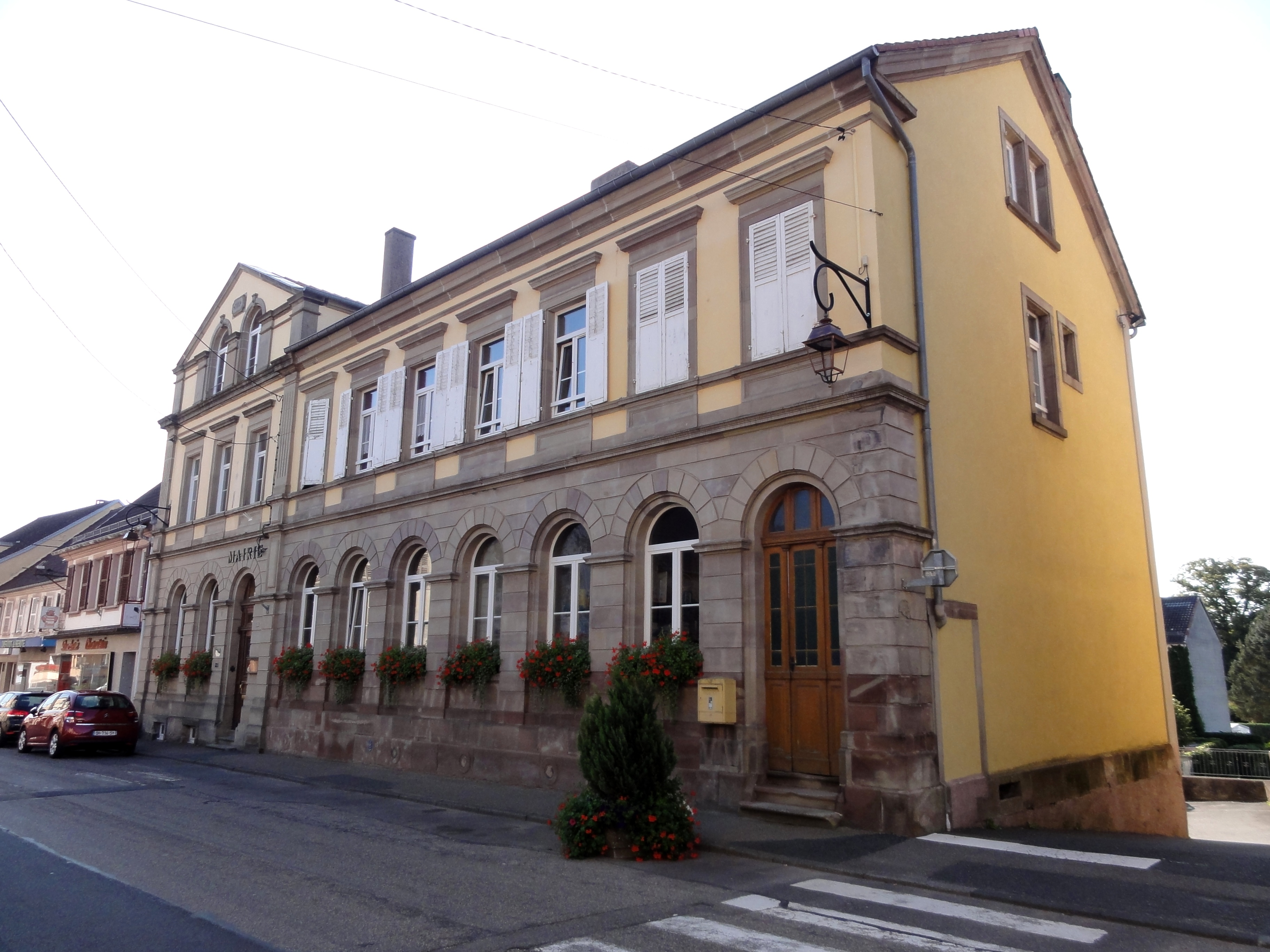
- The town hall in Drulingen

- Coat of arms
- Location of Drulingen
- Location within France Location within Grand Est
- Coordinates: 48°52′07″N 7°11′31″E
- Country: France
- Region: Grand Est
- Department: Bas-Rhin
- Arrondissement: Saverne
- Canton: Ingwiller

Government
  - Mayor (2020–2026): Jean-Louis Scheuer
- Area^{1}: 4.49 km^{2} (1.73 sq mi)
- Highest elevation: 327 m (1,073 ft)
- Lowest elevation: 273 m (896 ft)
- Population (2023): 1,397
  - Density: 311/km^{2} (806/sq mi)
- Time zone: UTC+01:00 (CET)
  - Summer (DST): UTC+02:00 (CEST)
- INSEE/Postal code: 67105 /67320
- ^{1} French Land Register data, which excludes lakes, ponds, glaciers > 1 km^{2} (0.386 sq mi or 247 acres) and river estuaries.

Drulingen (French pronunciation: [dʁyliŋ(ɡ)ən]) is a commune in the Bas-Rhin department in Grand Est in north-eastern France. Château de Drulingen was built in 1816.

== See also ==
- Communes of the Bas-Rhin department
