= Bas-Rhin =

Department of France

Bas-Rhin 's Unterlànd / Unterelsàss / Ingerlànd (Alsatian)
- Department
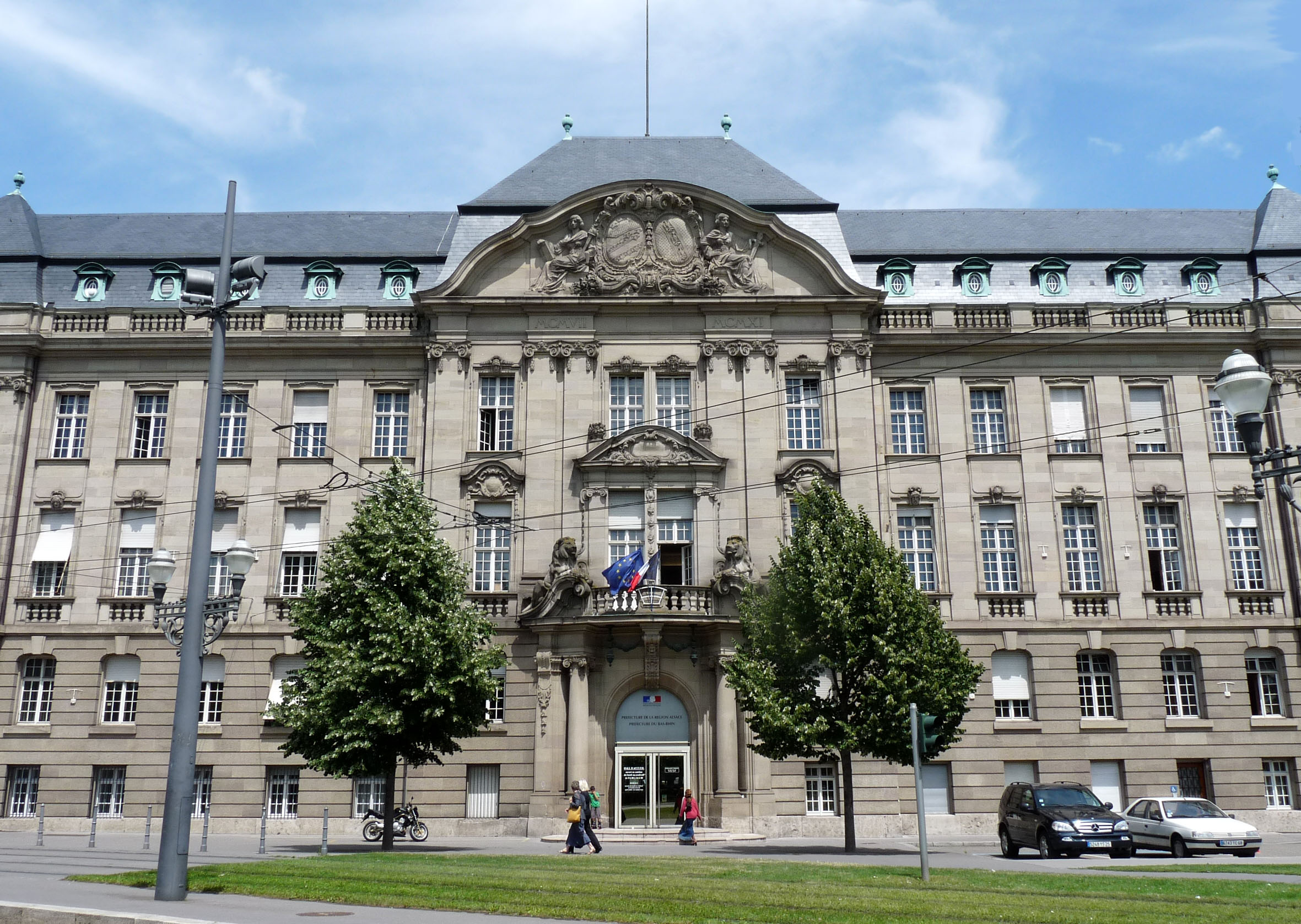
- Prefecture building of the Bas-Rhin department, in Strasbourg

- Coat of arms

- Location of Bas-Rhin in France
- Interactive map of Bas-Rhin
- Coordinates: 48°49′N 7°47′E
- Country: France
- Region: Grand Est
- Prefecture: Strasbourg
- Subprefectures: Haguenau; Molsheim; Saverne; Sélestat

Government
  - Prefect: Josiane Chevalier

Area^{1}
  - Total: 4,755 km^{2} (1,836 sq mi)

Population (2023)
  - Total: 1,163,810
  - Rank: 19th
  - Density: 244.8/km^{2} (633.9/sq mi)
- Time zone: UTC+1 (CET)
  - Summer (DST): UTC+2 (CEST)
- Department number: 67
- Arrondissements: 5
- Cantons: 23
- Communes: 514
- ^1 French Land Register data, which exclude estuaries and lakes, ponds and glaciers larger than 1 km^{2}

Bas-Rhin (French pronunciation: [bɑ ʁɛ̃]) is a department in Alsace which is a part of the Grand Est region of France. The name means 'Lower Rhine', referring to its lower altitude among the two French Rhine departments: it is downstream of the Haut-Rhin (Upper Rhine) department. Both belong to the European Upper Rhine region. It is, with the Haut-Rhin (Upper Rhine), one of the two departments of the traditional Alsace region which until 1871, also included the area now known as the Territoire de Belfort. The more populous and densely populated of the pair, it had 1,163,810 inhabitants in 2023. The prefecture is based in Strasbourg. The INSEE and Post Code is 67.

On 1 January 2021, the departemental councils of Bas-Rhin and Haut-Rhin merged into the European Collectivity of Alsace.

The inhabitants of the department are known as Bas-Rhinois or Bas-Rhinoises.

== Geography ==
The Rhine has always been of great historical and economic importance to the area, and it forms the eastern border of Bas-Rhin. The area is also home to some of the foothills of the Vosges Mountains.

To the north of Bas-Rhin lies the Palatinate Forest (Pfälzerwald) in the German State of Rhineland-Palatinate, and the German State of Baden-Württemberg lies to the east. To the south lies the department of Haut-Rhin, the town of Colmar and southern Alsace, and to the west the department of Moselle. On its south-western corner, Bas-Rhin also joins the departments of Vosges and Meurthe-et-Moselle.

=== Principal towns ===
The most populous commune is Strasbourg, the prefecture. As of 2023, there are 7 communes with more than 15,000 inhabitants:

Commune	Population (2023)
Strasbourg	293,771
Haguenau	36,391
Schiltigheim	34,708
Illkirch-Graffenstaden	27,872
Lingolsheim	20,826
Sélestat	19,589
Bischheim	18,558

=== Climate ===
The Bas-Rhin has a continental-type climate, characterised by cold, dry winters and hot, stormy summers, due to the western protection provided by the Vosges. The average annual temperature is 10.4 °C (51 °F) in the lowlands (Entzheim) and 7 °C (45 °F) on high ground. The annual maximum temperature is high (30 °C (86 °F)). The average rainfall is 700 mm (27.56 in) per year.

Established according to data from the Infoclimat station at Strasbourg-Entzheim (the airport), over the period from 1961 to 1990.

Lowest temperature	−23.2 °C
Coldest day	2 January 1971
Highest temperature	37.4 °C
Hottest day	2 July 1952
Highest 24-hour rainfall	62.9 mm
Wettest day	23 May 1978
Wettest year	1987 (811.1mm)
Dryest year	1949 (392.6mm)

Comparison of local Meteorological data with other cities in France
Town	Sunshine (hours/yr)	Rain (mm/yr)	Snow (days/yr)	Storm (days/yr)	Fog (days/yr)
National average	1,973	770	14	22	40
Strasbourg	1,693	665	29	29	56
Paris	1,661	637	12	18	10
Nice	2,724	767	1	29	1
Brest	1,605	1,211	7	12	75

Climate data for Strasbourg
Month	Jan	Feb	Mar	Apr	May	Jun	Jul	Aug	Sep	Oct	Nov	Dec	Year
Mean daily maximum °C (°F)	4.5 (40.1)	6.4 (43.5)	11.4 (52.5)	15.7 (60.3)	20.2 (68.4)	23.4 (74.1)	25.7 (78.3)	25.4 (77.7)	21.0 (69.8)	15.3 (59.5)	8.8 (47.8)	5.2 (41.4)	15.3 (59.5)
Daily mean °C (°F)	1.9 (35.4)	2.9 (37.2)	7.0 (44.6)	10.5 (50.9)	15.0 (59.0)	18.1 (64.6)	20.1 (68.2)	19.8 (67.6)	15.8 (60.4)	11.2 (52.2)	5.8 (42.4)	2.8 (37.0)	10.9 (51.6)
Mean daily minimum °C (°F)	−0.8 (30.6)	−0.6 (30.9)	2.5 (36.5)	5.2 (41.4)	9.8 (49.6)	12.8 (55.0)	14.5 (58.1)	14.1 (57.4)	10.6 (51.1)	7.1 (44.8)	2.8 (37.0)	0.4 (32.7)	6.5 (43.7)
Average precipitation mm (inches)	32.2 (1.27)	34.5 (1.36)	42.8 (1.69)	45.9 (1.81)	81.9 (3.22)	71.6 (2.82)	72.7 (2.86)	61.4 (2.42)	63.5 (2.50)	61.5 (2.42)	47.0 (1.85)	50.0 (1.97)	665.0 (26.18)
Average precipitation days (≥ 1 mm)	8.4	8.1	9.1	9.2	11.5	10.7	10.8	9.9	8.6	9.5	9.3	9.8	114.9
Mean monthly sunshine hours	58	84	135	180	202	224	229	220	164	99	55	43	1,693
Source: Meteorological data for Strasbourg - 150m altitude, from 1981 to 2010 January 2015 (in French)

== Etymology ==
Bas-Rhin is the last French department to have kept the term Bas meaning "Lower" in its name. Other departments using this prefix preferred to change their names—e.g.: Basses-Pyrénées in 1969 became Pyrénées-Atlantiques and Basses-Alpes in 1970 became the department of Alpes-de-Haute-Provence. The same phenomenon was observed for the inférieur (also meaning "lower") departments such as Charente-Inférieure, Seine-Inférieure, and Loire-Inférieure.

== History ==
Bas-Rhin is one of the original 83 departments created on 4 March 1790, during the French Revolution.

On 14 January 1790 the National Constituent Assembly decreed:

- "- That Alsace be divided into two departments with Strasbourg and Colmar as their capitals;
- - That the Department of Strasbourg will be divided into three districts [...];
- - That the land of the German princes, coming under the sovereignty of France will be included in the division of districts;
- - That Landau, an enclave in the Palatinate, will have special justice [...]."

The borders of Bas-Rhin have changed many times:

- In 1793 it absorbed the following territories newly annexed by France:
  - The County of Sarrewerden;
  - The County of Drulingen;
  - The lordship of Diemeringen;
  - The lordship of Asswiller of the Steinkallenfels family;
  - Several communes from the Palatinate
- In 1795 the region of Schirmeck, where the people did not speak Alsatian, was detached from the district of Sélestat and attached to Vosges (District of Senones);
- In 1808 some territories east of the Rhine were annexed, especially the city of Kehl;
- In 1814, after the first Treaty of Paris, France gained the territories north of the Lauter from the former department of Mont-Tonnerre and including the city of Landau, but lost all the territories east of the Rhine;
- In 1815, following the second Treaty of Paris, France lost all the territories north of the Lauter and the department was occupied by troops from Baden and Saxony from June 1815 to November 1818.
- In 1871 Bas-Rhin was annexed by Germany (by the Treaty of Frankfurt) and then became Bezirk Unterelsass in Reichsland Elsaß-Lothringen;
- In 1919 Bas-Rhin became French again (Treaty of Versailles) and retained the territories that Germany had taken from the department of Vosges in 1871 (the Canton of Schirmeck and Canton of Saales);
- Between 1941 and 1944, the Natzweiler-Struthof concentration camp was in operation
- In 1944 Kehl was attached to Bas-Rhin before being reassigned to the new West Germany in 1953;
- In 1982 the department was included in the newly created Alsace region;
- On 7 April 2013 a referendum was held on the creation of a single community in Alsace for joining the Alsace region and the two departments of Haut-Rhin and Bas-Rhin.

Strasbourg, the chef lieu (principal city) of Bas-Rhin is the official seat of the European Parliament as well as of the Council of Europe.

=== Heraldry ===
Arms of Aigrefeuille d'Aunis	The coat of arms of Bas-Rhin is closely linked to the history of Basse-Alsace. It appeared for the first time in 1262 on a seal of the Counts of Werd who originated from Woerth near Erstein and who became landgrafs of Lower Alsace in 1156. Blazon: Gules, a bend argent cotised fleury the same.

== Demography ==
The demography of Bas-Rhin is characterized by high density and high population growth since the 1950s.

In January 2023 Bas-Rhin officially had 1,163,810 inhabitants and was 19th by population at the national level. In sixteen years, from 2007 to 2023, its population grew by 79,000 people, or about 4,900 people per year. But this variation is differentiated among the 514 communes that make up the department.

The population density of Bas-Rhin is 245 inhabitants per square kilometre in 2023, which is more than twice the average in France, which was 121 in 2023.

=== Changing demographics in Bas-Rhin ===
With 540,213 inhabitants in 1831, the department represented 1.66% of the total French population, which was then 32,569,000 inhabitants. From 1831 to 1866, the department gained 48,757 people, an increase of 0.26% on average per year compared to the national average of 0.48% over the same period.

Demographic change between the Franco-Prussian War of 1870 and the First World War was higher than the national average. Over this period, the population increased by 100,532 inhabitants, an increase of 16.74%, compared to 10% nationally. The population increased by 9.23% between the two world wars from 1921 to 1936 compared to a national growth of 6.9%.

Like other French departments, Bas-Rhin experienced a population boom after the Second World War, higher than the national level. The rate of population growth between 1946 and 2007 was 83.83%, compared to 57% nationally.

Historical population

Year	Pop.	±% p.a.
1801	450,238	—
1806	500,926	+2.16%
1831	540,213	+0.30%
1836	561,859	+0.79%
1841	560,113	−0.06%
1851	587,434	+0.48%
1856	563,855	−0.82%
1861	577,574	+0.48%
1866	588,970	+0.39%
1872	600,406	+0.32%
1876	598,180	−0.09%
1881	612,015	+0.46%
1886	612,077	+0.00%
1891	621,505	+0.31%
1896	638,624	+0.54%
1901	659,432	+0.64%
1906	686,695	+0.81%

Year	Pop.	±% p.a.
1911	700,938	+0.41%
1921	651,686	−0.73%
1926	670,985	+0.59%
1931	688,242	+0.51%
1936	711,830	+0.68%
1946	673,281	−0.56%
1954	707,934	+0.63%
1962	770,150	+1.06%
1968	827,367	+1.20%
1975	882,121	+0.92%
1982	915,676	+0.53%
1990	953,053	+0.50%
1999	1,026,120	+0.82%
2007	1,084,840	+0.70%
2012	1,104,667	+0.36%
2017	1,125,559	+0.38%
2023	1,163,810	+0.56%

Source: SPLAF and INSEE

== Economy ==
The Bas-Rhin department has a high density of SMEs and SMIs and a higher proportion of workers in industry than the national average. Tourism activity is intense and creates many indirect jobs. The rate of unemployment is among the lowest in France: 6.5%. The average GDP per capita is €18,795 which places the region as the second largest in France with 2.9% of national GDP. Employment is distributed in the following way, as a percentage of the labor force:

- Agriculture: 8,411 or 2%
- Crafts and industry: 97,349 or 24.2%
- Building and public works: 23,928 or 6.0%
- Tertiary sector: 271,984 or 67.8%
- Frontaliers: 28,186

Weighting of the major economic sectors

Trades: 11,358 companies comprising:

- Supply: 11%
- Production: 21%
- Building: 37%
- Services: 31%

Food industry: 568 units employing 15,884 employees

Commerce:

- Hypermarkets: 15
- Supermarkets: 117
- Other retail: 7,507 including non-food 5,229

Tourism: 3,216 hotels with 11,100 rooms

== Law ==
Alsace and the adjacent Moselle department have a legal system slightly different from the rest of France. The statutes in question date from the period 1871–1919 when the area was part of the German Empire. With the return of Alsace-Lorraine to France in 1919, Paris accepted that Alsace and Moselle should retain some local laws in respect of certain matters, especially with regard to hunting, economic life, local government relationships, health insurance and social rights. It includes notably the absence of any formal separation between church and state: several mainstream denominations of the Christian church benefit from state funding, in contrast to principles applied in the rest of France.

== Politics ==
=== Presidential elections 2nd round ===
Election	Winning candidate	Party	%	2nd place candidate	Party	%
2022	Emmanuel Macron	LREM	58.96	Marine Le Pen	FN	41.04
2017	Emmanuel Macron	LREM	63.07	Marine Le Pen	FN	36.93
2012	Nicolas Sarkozy	UMP	63.44	François Hollande	PS	36.56
2007	Nicolas Sarkozy	UMP	65.58	Ségolène Royal	PS	34.42
2002	Jacques Chirac	RPR	79.32	Jean-Marie Le Pen	FN	20.68
1995	Jacques Chirac	RPR	58.97	Lionel Jospin	PS	41.03

=== Current National Assembly Representatives ===
Constituency	Member	Party
Bas-Rhin's 1st constituency	Sandra Regol	The Ecologists
Bas-Rhin's 2nd constituency	Emmanuel Fernandes	La France Insoumise
Bas-Rhin's 3rd constituency	Thierry Sother	Socialist Party
Bas-Rhin's 4th constituency	Françoise Buffet	Renaissance
Bas-Rhin's 5th constituency	Charles Sitzenstuhl	Renaissance
Bas-Rhin's 6th constituency	Louise Morel	MoDem
Bas-Rhin's 7th constituency	Patrick Hetzel	The Republicans
Bas-Rhin's 8th constituency	Théo Bernhardt	National Rally
Bas-Rhin's 9th constituency	Vincent Thiébaut	Horizons

== Administration ==
The seat of the General Council is located in Strasbourg, in a building designed by the architect Claude Vasconi. The current prefect of the Bas-Rhin is Stéphane Fratacci. The representative of the Lower Rhine for the National Youth Council is Mr. Gautier Lutz.

Bas-Rhin is composed of five arrondissements (Haguenau-Wissembourg, Molsheim, Saverne, Sélestat-Erstein, and Strasbourg) and 23 cantons.

== Higher education ==
Through its secondary and higher education institutions, Alsace is an important region for students and is internationally oriented. Strasbourg alone welcomes 75% of students in its university. Since the merger of three faculties and the IUT of Illkirch and of Schiltigheim it has become one of the largest universities in France. There are also renowned institutions such as the National School of Administration (ENA), the National Institute of Territorial Studies (INET), the Higher European Institute of Management, and the National School of Physics of Strasbourg.

== Tourism ==
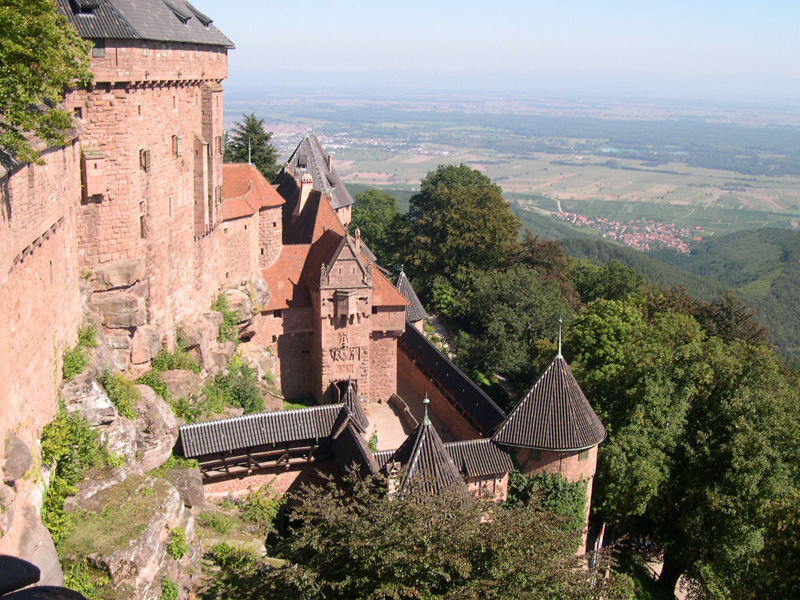
Château du Haut-Kœnigsbourg

The Château du Haut-Kœnigsbourg: built in the 12th century, the castle of Haut-Koenigsbourg dominates the plain of Alsace more than 700 metres (2,297 feet) above sea level. Destroyed during the Thirty Years' War, it was restored from 1900 to 1908 by the German Emperor Wilhelm II. It houses a large collection of weapons and period furniture.

The Château du Fleckenstein: early 12th century, built by the imperial family of Hohenstaufen, the castle was occupied and turned into an impregnable fortress by the Fleckenstein family. Many activities are offered such as the "Castle of challenges". There is a large selection of 20 games crossing the forest and in the secret rooms of the castle to discover life in the Middle Ages.

The Château de Lichtenberg: built in the early 13th century on a hill overlooking the village, the site includes contemporary space-related cultural activities.

With more than 27 million tourists per year, Bas-Rhin is the 5th largest French department for the number of room-nights for visitors per year.

Other sites of interest are:

- Château de La Petite-Pierre
- Château du Haut-Barr
- Château de Diedendorf
- Château d'Andlau
- Château de Kintzheim

=== Religious monuments ===
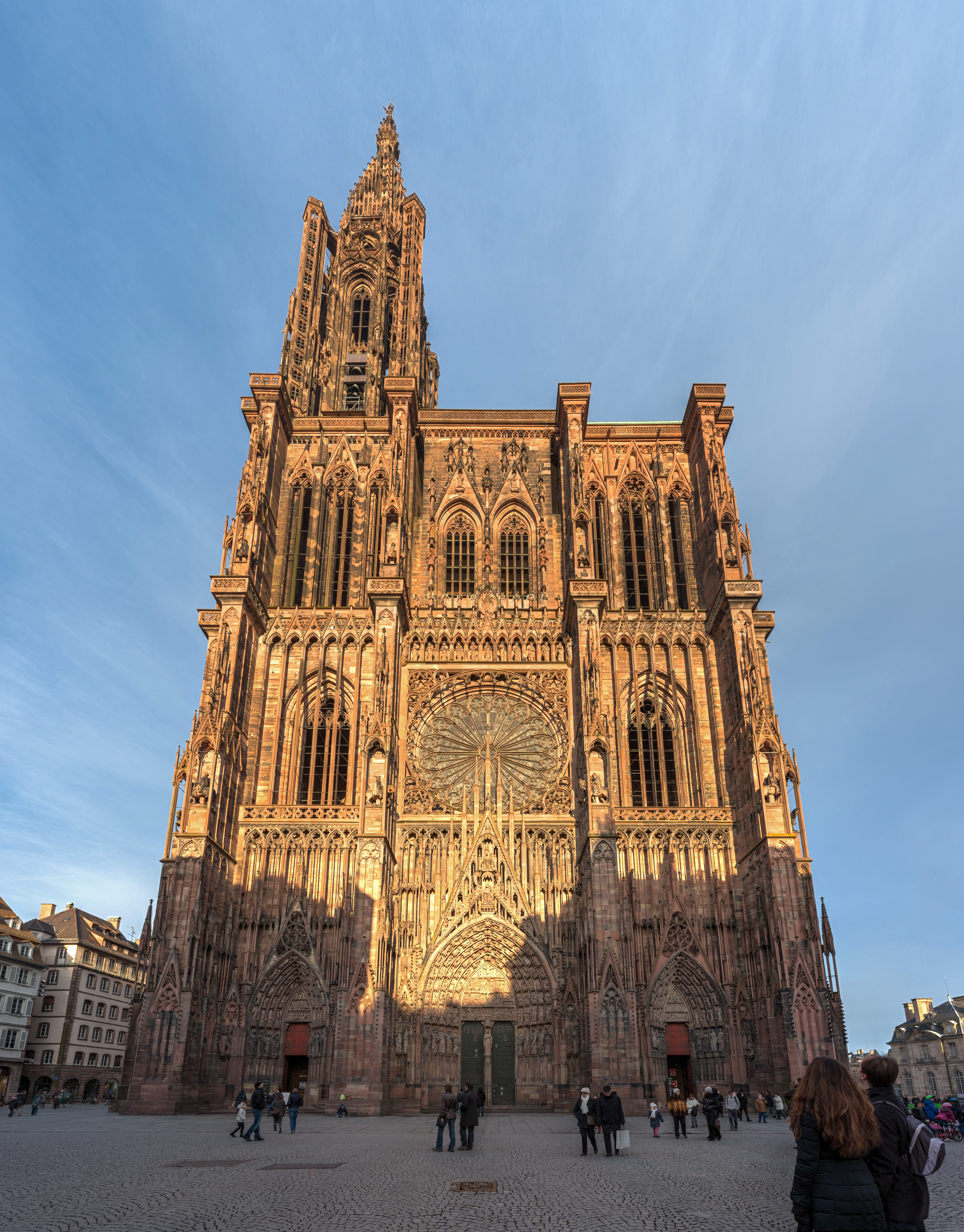
Strasbourg Cathedral

Strasbourg Cathedral: Strasbourg Cathedral is a masterpiece of Gothic art. Measuring 142 metres high from the Parvise to the top of the tower, it is considered the second largest cathedral in France after that of Rouen. Its astronomical clock dates from the Renaissance and the mechanism dated 1492 is a masterpiece in itself.

The Mont Sainte-Odile: a living spiritual place. Rising to 764 metres, this mountain in Vosges is topped by a monastery founded by Saint-Odile, the patron saint of Alsace. It is a tourist attraction and also a place of pilgrimage.

=== Museums ===
Museums in Strasbourg

The Alsatian Museum: A museum of art and popular traditions. There is a large collection of utilitarian objects, decorative objects, as well as costumes that depict everyday life in Alsace in the 18th and 19th centuries.

The Strasbourg Museum of Modern and Contemporary Art: Located in the heart of the city of Strasbourg, the Museum of Modern and Contemporary houses nearly 18,000 works divided into three departments: fine arts, graphic art, and photography. Some of the greatest innovators of the 20th century are on display.

The Tomi Ungerer Museum: there is a large collection of drawings, archives, magazines, and toys donated to his hometown by the French illustrator Tomi Ungerer. It also hosts temporary exhibitions.

The Palais Rohan: The Rohan Palace was built between 1731 and 1742 at the request of Armand de Rohan-Soubise, Cardinal and Bishop of Strasbourg, who made his residence in the historic heart of the city. It also hosts the Arts and Crafts Museum, Archaeological Museum, and the Museum of Fine Arts.

=== Second homes ===
As of 2020, 3.3% of available housing in the department were second homes.

Communes with population over 1,000 and more than 10% of second homes in 2019
Town	Municipal population	Percentage of second homes
Wangenbourg-Engenthal	1,332	23.6%
Grendelbruch	1,218	17.2%
Bœrsch	2,442	14.2%
Lembach	1,548	12.8%
Entzheim	2,453	12.2%

== Transport ==
=== Airport ===
Bas-Rhin is served by Strasbourg Airport, providing direct routes to major domestic destinations as well as international destinations in Europe and northern Africa. The airport is linked to the Gare de Strasbourg by a frequent train service. However, other airports such as EuroAirport Basel Mulhouse Freiburg, Karlsruhe/Baden-Baden Airport and Stuttgart Airport are also used by air travellers from the department.

== Popular traditions ==
=== The stork ===
The stork is the emblematic bird of Alsace. According to legend, it brings newborn babies wrapped in a cloth tightly in its beak. Having disappeared from the local habitat, it has now returned, being protected, and has become an integral part of the landscape. They can be seen mostly on the roofs of public buildings and more on houses.

=== Traditional costume ===
The traditional Alsatian costume is a symbol of the region. Although it is usually composed of a black hat and a red skirt, the symbol of Alsace, there are many other outfits that vary between villages but also according to the social status of the person. Today virtually disappeared, they can still be seen in some villages at various events and through folk groups.

=== Festivals ===
Many traditions have their origins in a quest for the meaning of life or in the rites of protection e.g. Christian festivals, even today create the rhythm of life in the villages of the region. The four seasons each have their share of celebrations: crop harvest, grape harvest, employers' feast days, crafts, yard sales, local produce.

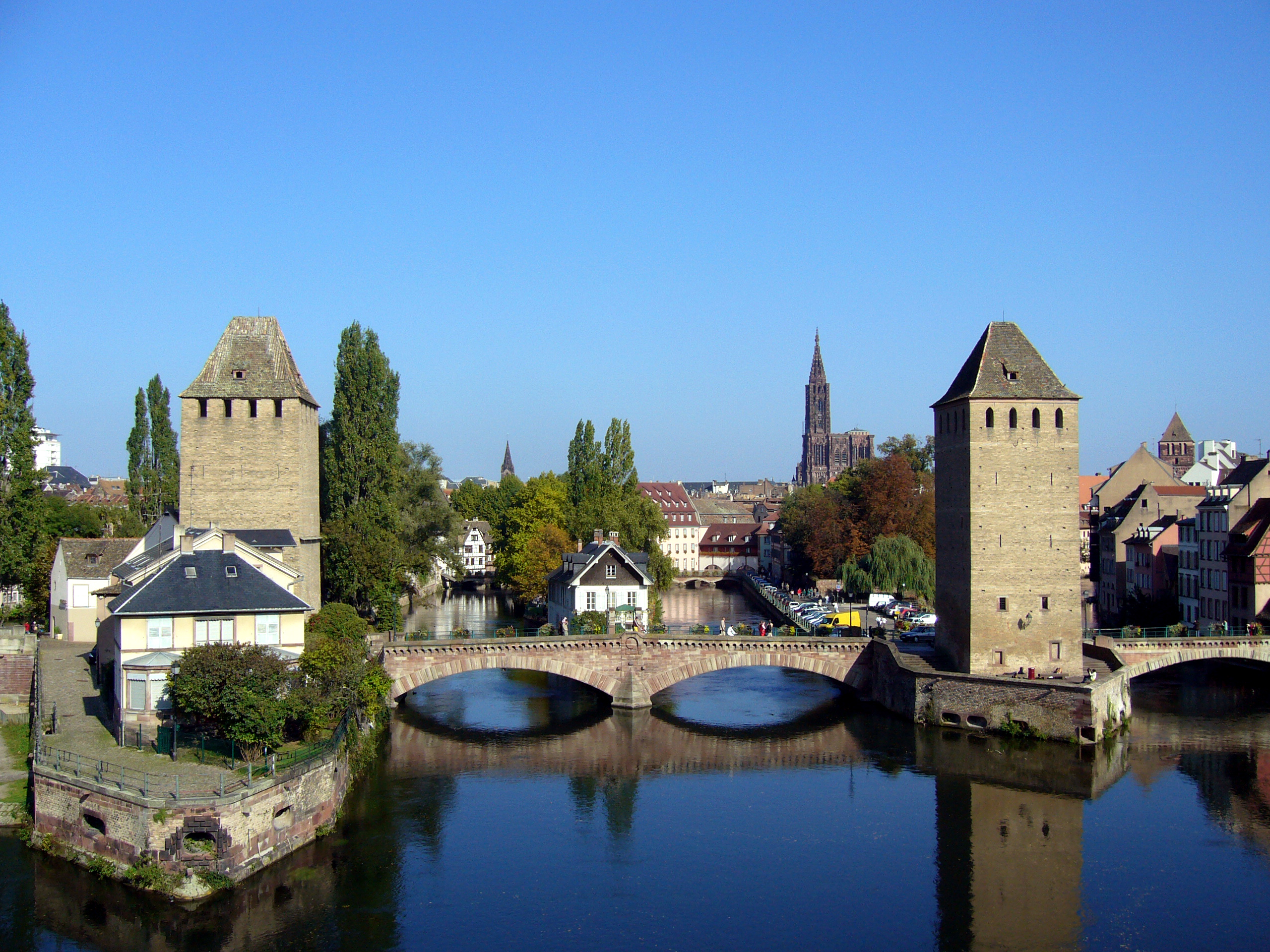
Covered Bridge at Strasbourg

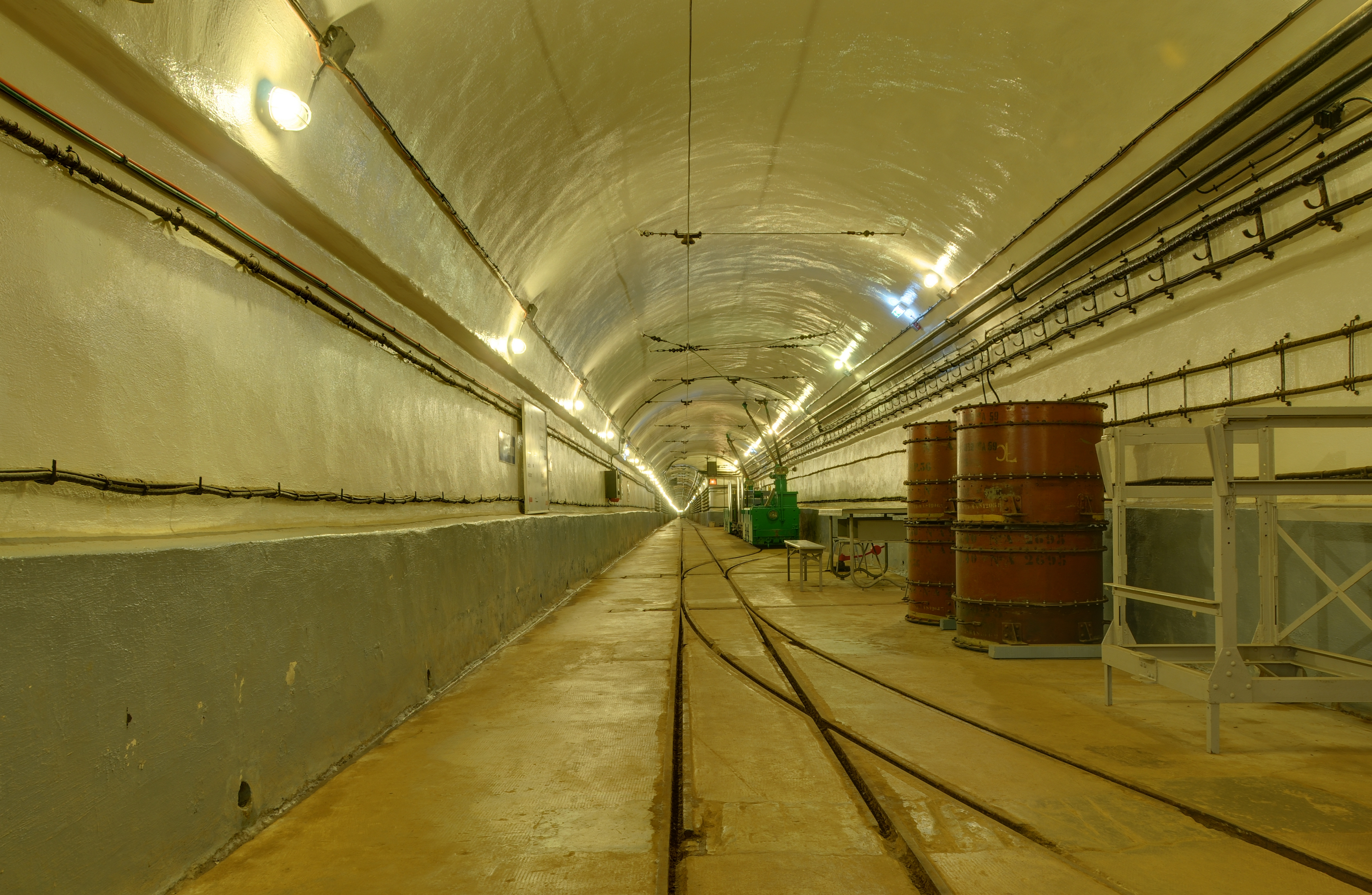
Schoenenbourg Fortification of the Maginot Line

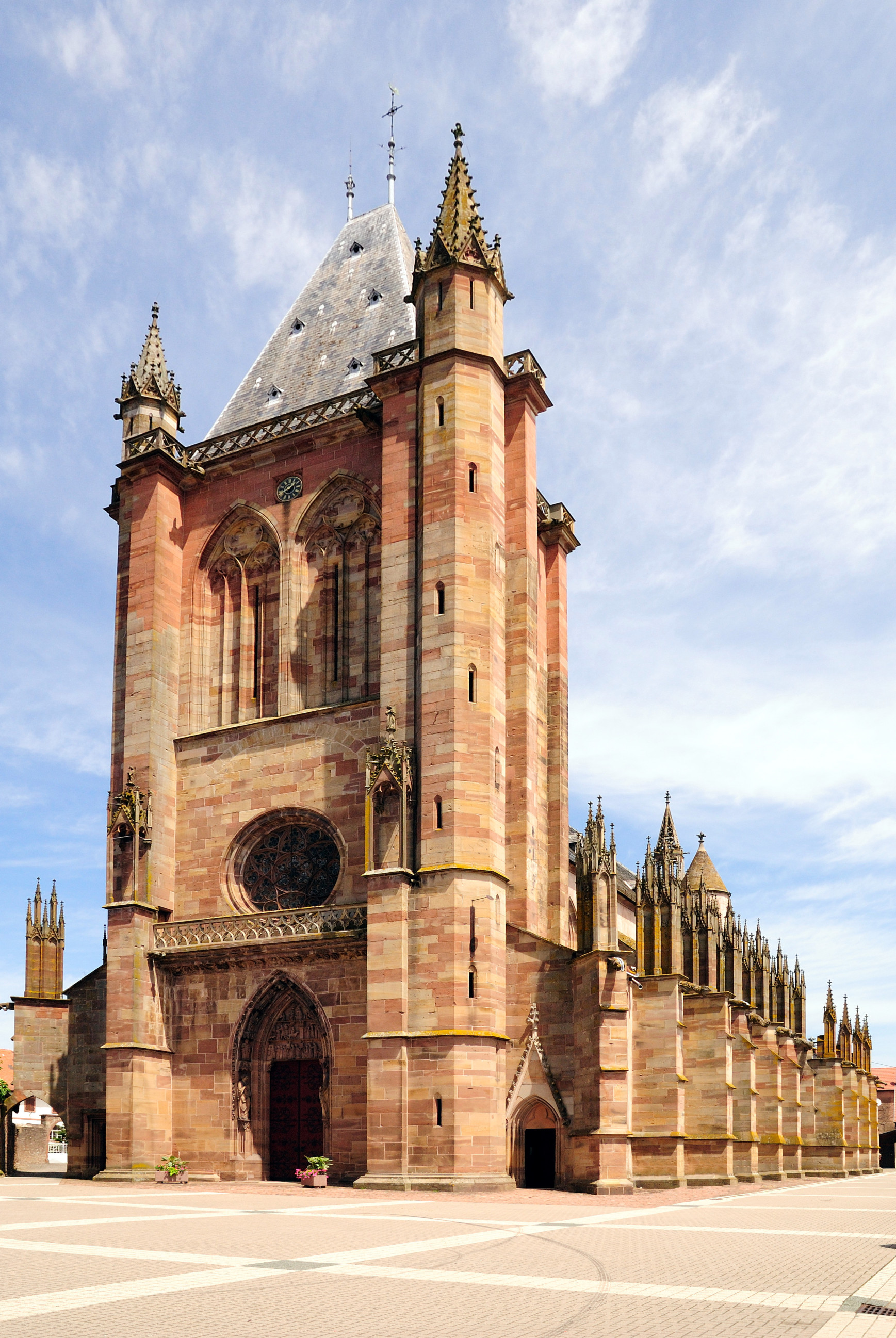
Church at Niederhaslach

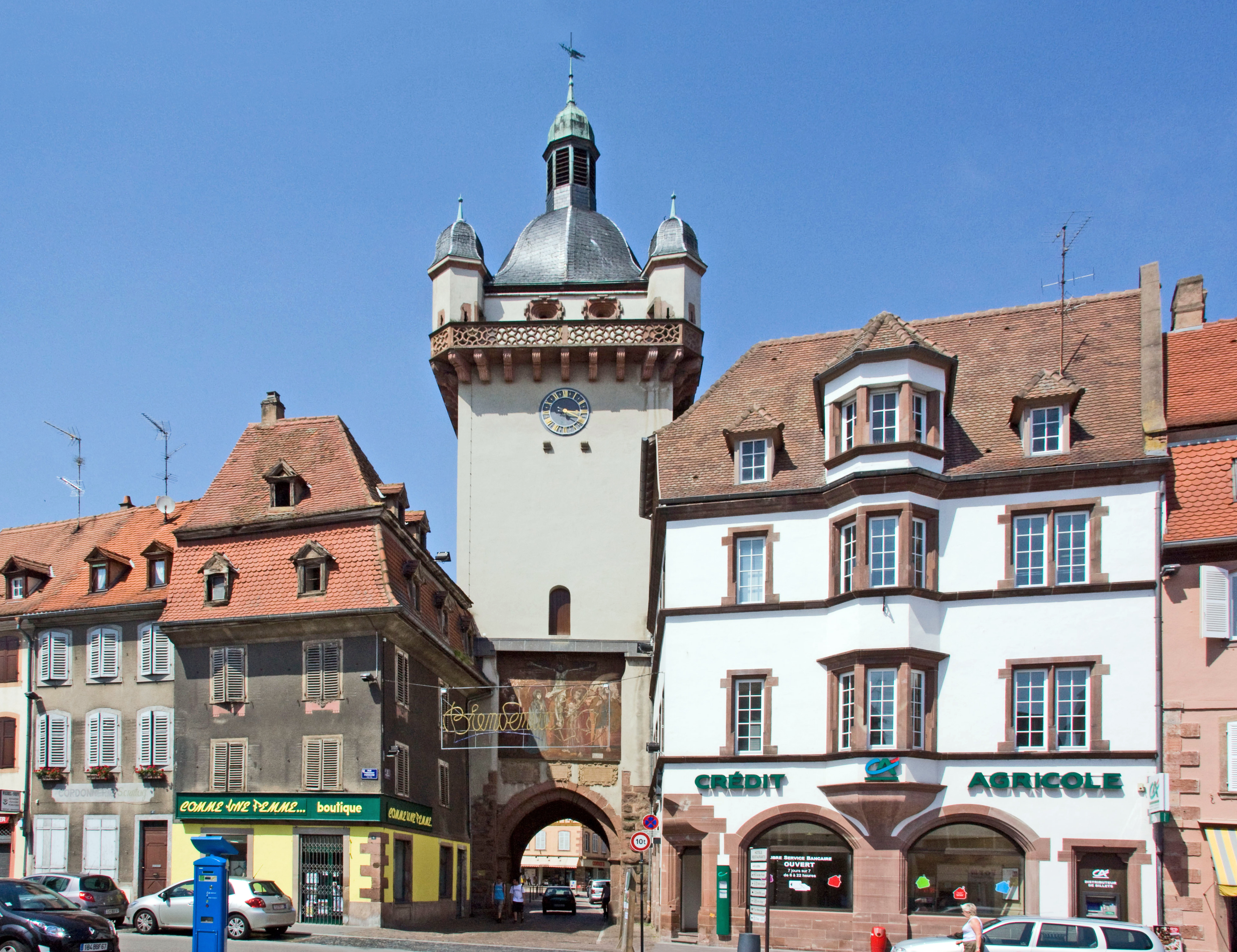
Clock Tower at Sélestat

== See also ==
- Arrondissements of the Bas-Rhin département
- Cantons of the Bas-Rhin département
- Communes of the Bas-Rhin department sorted by arrondissements and cantons
- Communities of Communes of the Bas-Rhin département
- Haut-Rhin
