= Results of the 2024 French legislative election in Loir-et-Cher =

Following the first round of the 2024 French legislative election on 30 June 2024, runoff elections in each constituency where no candidate received a vote share greater than 50 percent were scheduled for 7 July. Candidates permitted to stand in the runoff elections needed to either come in first or second place in the first round or achieve more than 12.5 percent of the votes of the entire electorate (as opposed to 12.5 percent of the vote share due to low turnout).

== Loir-et-Cher ==
=== 1st constituency ===
Candidate	Party or alliance		First round		Second round	
Candidate	Party or alliance		Votes	%	Votes	%
Marine Bardet	National Rally		19,074	35.22	21,381	39.80
Marc Fesneau	Ensemble	Democratic Movement	18,711	34.55	32,336	60.20
Reda Belkadi	Miscellaneous left	Independent	8,311	15.35		
Pierre-Gilles Parra	The Republicans		3,220	5.95		
Gildas Vieira	Miscellaneous centre	Independent	2,867	5.29		
Alain Lombard	Far-left	Lutte Ouvrière	1,828	3.38		
François Dassonneville	Independent		138	0.25		
Jean-Marc Tran	Independent		4	0.01		
Total			54,153	100.00	53,717	100.00
Valid votes			54,153	96.96	53,717	94.83
Invalid votes			478	0.86	781	1.38
Blank votes			1,221	2.19	2,147	3.79
Total votes			55,852	100.00	56,645	100.00
Registered voters/turnout			82,706	67.53	82,775	68.43

=== 2nd constituency ===
Candidate	Party or alliance		First round		Second round	
Candidate	Party or alliance		Votes	%	Votes	%
Roger Chudeau	National Rally		25,615	49.72	27,192	52.25
Nils Aucante	Miscellaneous right	Independent	10,340	20.07	24,855	47.75
Sylvie Mayer	New Popular Front	Communist Party	10,027	19.46		
Alexandre Guillemaud	Union of Democrats and Independents		2,803	5.44		
Hervé Lancelot	Reconquête		1,719	3.34		
Caroline Maidon	Far-left	Lutte Ouvrière	966	1.88		
Bénédicte de Saint-Pierre	Miscellaneous right	Independent	46	0.09		
Eric Fouque	Independent		0	0.00		
Total			51,516	100.00	52,047	100.00
Valid votes			51,516	95.23	52,047	95.17
Invalid votes			676	1.25	732	1.34
Blank votes			1,903	3.52	1,909	3.49
Total votes			54,095	100.00	54,688	100.00
Registered voters/turnout			80,280	67.38	80,292	68.11

=== 3rd constituency ===
Candidate	Party or alliance		First round		Second round	
Candidate	Party or alliance		Votes	%	Votes	%
Virginia de Oliveira	National Rally		22,682	41.07	24,877	45.30
Christophe Marion	Ensemble	Renaissance	20,014	36.24	30,035	54.70
Noé Petit	New Popular Front	The Ecologists	10,795	19.55		
Claude Lamy	Far-left	Lutte Ouvrière	986	1.79		
Alexandre Bonnassieux	Reconquête		748	1.35		
Total			55,225	100.00	54,912	100.00
Valid votes			55,225	96.93	54,912	95.30
Invalid votes			557	0.98	730	1.27
Blank votes			1,190	2.09	1,981	3.44
Total votes			56,972	100.00	57,623	100.00
Registered voters/turnout			81,054	70.29	81,055	71.09
