= Mathilde Desjonquères =

French politician (born 1980)

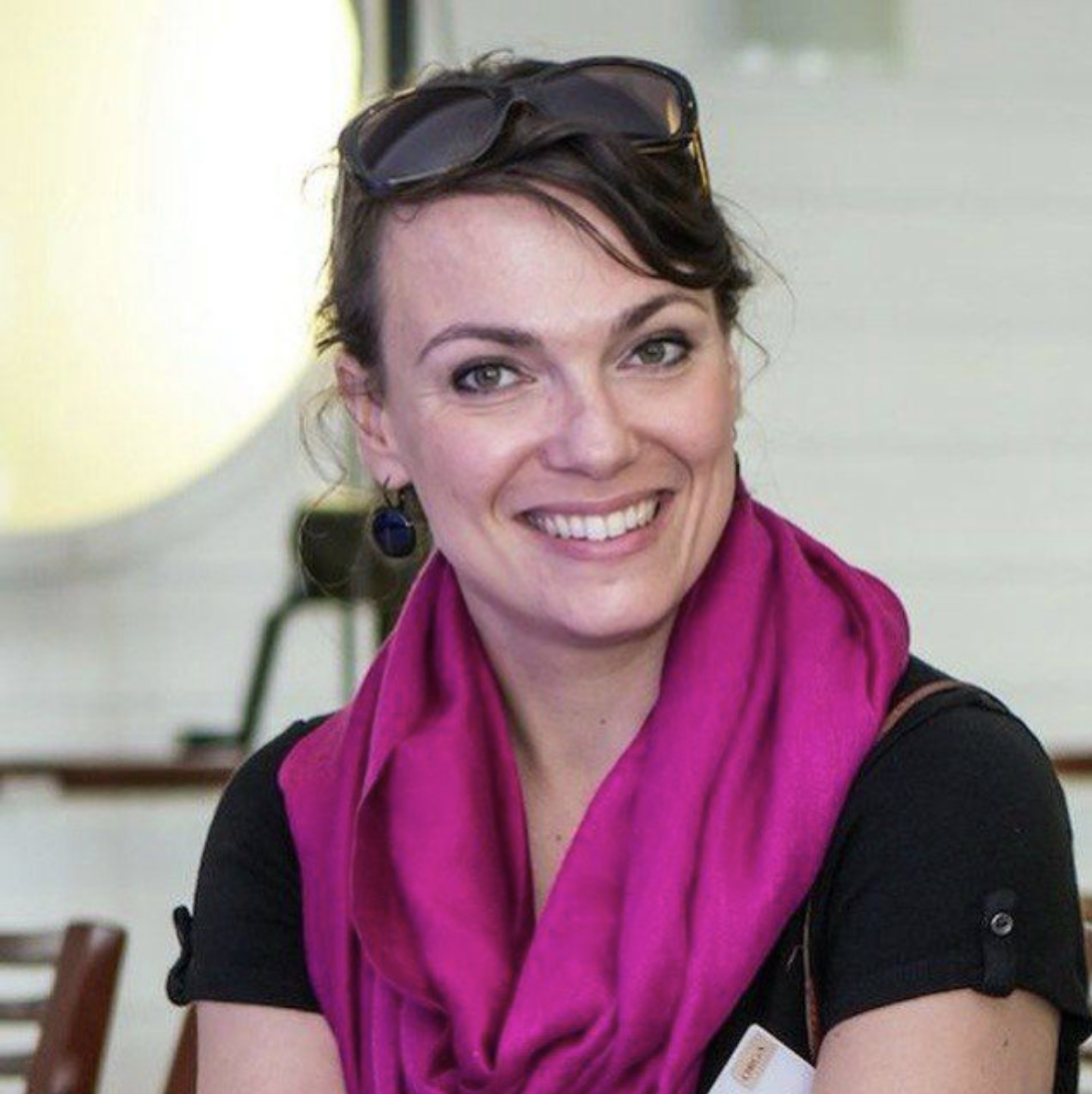
- Desjonquères in 2023

Member of the French National Assembly for Loir-et-Cher's 1st constituency
- In office 23 July 2022 – 9 June 2024
- Preceded by: Marc Fesneau
- Succeeded by: Marc Fesneau

Personal details
- Born: 6 September 1980 (age 45)
- Party: Democratic Movement

Mathilde Desjonquères (born 6 September 1980) is a French politician serving as a municipal councillor of Blois since 2020. From 2022 to 2024, she was a member of the National Assembly.

== Biography ==
A graduate in history from the Catholic University of Paris and in art history from the Rennes 2 University, she worked as a historian at the Maison d'Auguste Comte in Paris and at the Compiègne Memorial to Internment and Deportation, before joining the Pontrieux Communauté community of municipalities as director of tourism, heritage, and culture.

Committed to issues of gender parity and equality, she has, among other things, coordinated the development of the “Women in the Economy” Awards, which each year recognize women entrepreneurs, executives, or project leaders who actively contribute to the economic development of their region.

She worked as chief of staff in the constituency of MP Richard Ramos, after having been head of communications and marketing at France Loire. She then headed the culture and sports department of the city of Beaugency until her election as MP.

She was elected city councilor for the city of Blois and community councilor for Agglopolys in 2020. A member of the MoDem party, she is spokesperson for the Loir-et-Cher federation.

She campaigned alongside Marc Fesneau during the 2022 legislative elections. After his appointment as Minister of Agriculture and Food Sovereignty, she joined the National Assembly on July 23, 2022, where she sits on the Law Committee (French National Assembly).
