= Sainte-Anne, Loir-et-Cher =

Sainte-Anne
- Commune
- Coat of arms
- Location of Sainte-Anne
- Location within France Location within Centre-Val de Loire
- Coordinates: 47°45′29″N 1°04′58″E
- Country: France
- Region: Centre-Val de Loire
- Department: Loir-et-Cher
- Arrondissement: Vendôme
- Canton: Vendôme
- Intercommunality: CA Territoires Vendômois

Government
  - Mayor (2020–2026): Laure Antheaume
- Area^{1}: 5.13 km^{2} (1.98 sq mi)
- Elevation: 137 m (449 ft)
- Highest elevation: 139 m (456 ft)
- Lowest elevation: 103 m (338 ft)
- Population (2023): 476
  - Density: 92.8/km^{2} (240/sq mi)
- Time zone: UTC+01:00 (CET)
  - Summer (DST): UTC+02:00 (CEST)
- INSEE/Postal code: 41200 /41100
- ^{1} French Land Register data, which excludes lakes, ponds, glaciers > 1 km^{2} (0.386 sq mi or 247 acres) and river estuaries.

Sainte-Anne (French pronunciation: [sɛ̃t an]) is a commune in the Loir-et-Cher department of central France.

== Population ==
Historical population
Year	Pop.	±% p.a.
1968	109	—
1975	121	+1.50%
1982	242	+10.41%
1990	254	+0.61%
1999	273	+0.80%
2007	365	+3.70%
2012	401	+1.90%
2017	459	+2.74%
2023	476	+0.61%
Source: INSEE

== See also ==
- Communes of the Loir-et-Cher department
