= Areines =

- Commune
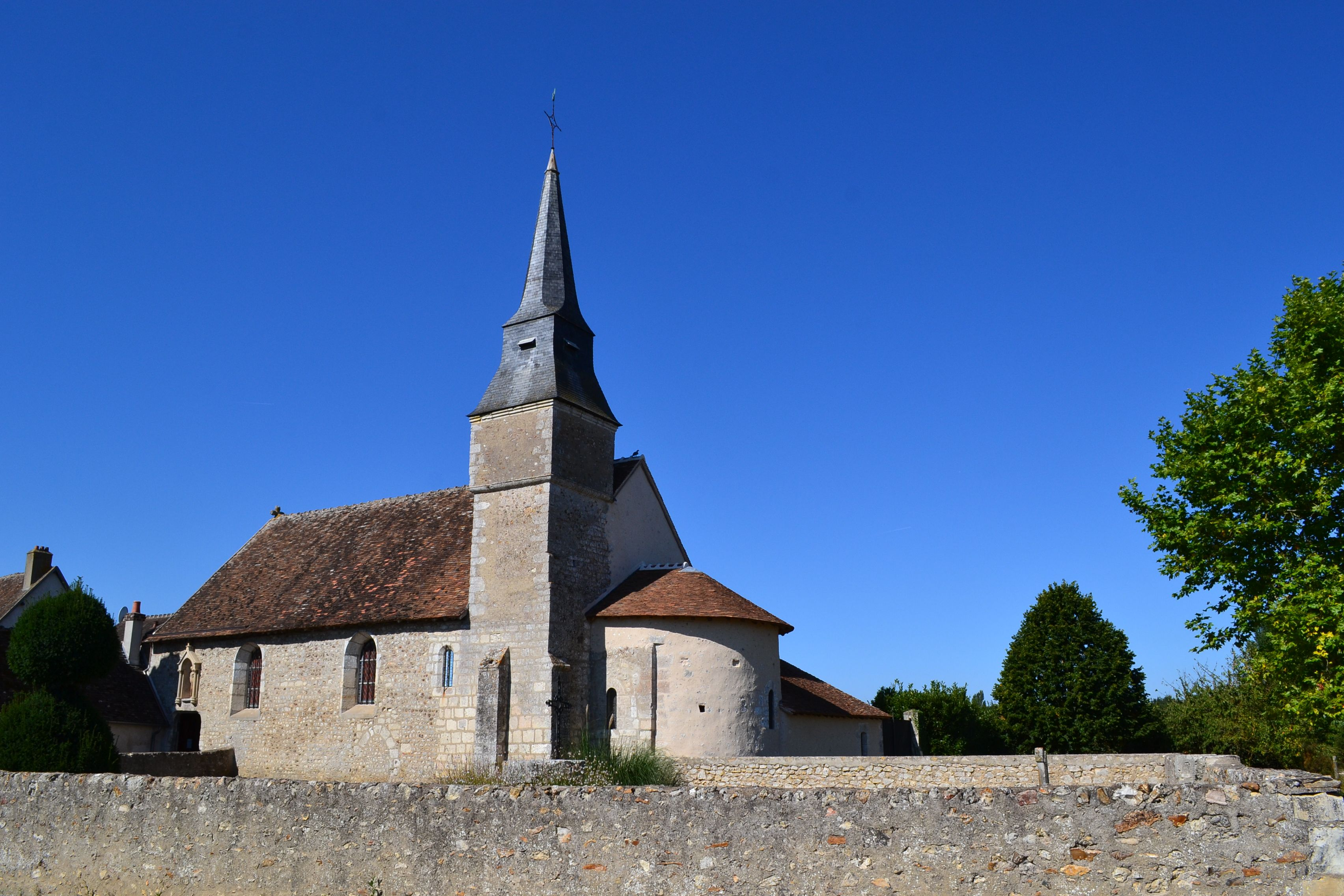
- Church of Our Lady

- Coat of arms
- Location of Areines
- Location within France Location within Centre-Val de Loire
- Coordinates: 47°48′07″N 1°05′43″E
- Country: France
- Region: Centre-Val de Loire
- Department: Loir-et-Cher
- Arrondissement: Vendôme
- Canton: Vendôme
- Intercommunality: CA Territoires Vendômois

Government
  - Mayor (2020–2026): Nicole Jeantheau
- Area^{1}: 4.84 km^{2} (1.87 sq mi)
- Elevation: 84 m (276 ft)
- Highest elevation: 130 m (430 ft)
- Lowest elevation: 77 m (253 ft)
- Population (2023): 572
  - Density: 118/km^{2} (306/sq mi)
- Time zone: UTC+01:00 (CET)
  - Summer (DST): UTC+02:00 (CEST)
- INSEE/Postal code: 41003 /41100
- ^{1} French Land Register data, which excludes lakes, ponds, glaciers > 1 km^{2} (0.386 sq mi or 247 acres) and river estuaries.

Areines (French pronunciation: [aʁɛn]) is a commune in the Loir-et-Cher department in central France.

== Population ==
Historical population
Year	Pop.	±% p.a.
1968	289	—
1975	379	+3.95%
1982	530	+4.91%
1990	555	+0.58%
1999	532	−0.47%
2007	597	+1.45%
2012	611	+0.46%
2017	616	+0.16%
2023	572	−1.23%
Source: INSEE

== See also ==
- Communes of the Loir-et-Cher department
