= Mazangé =

- Commune
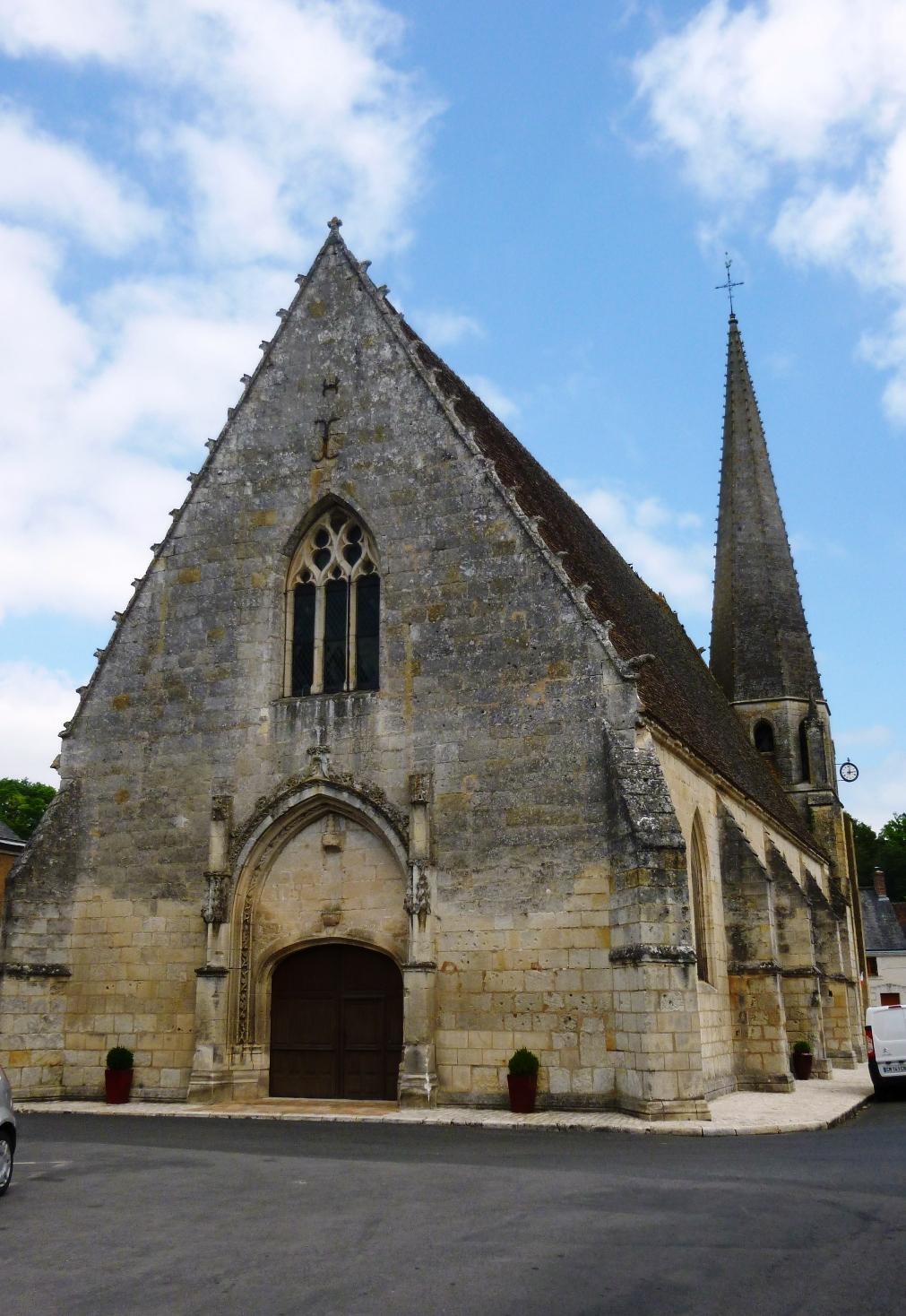

- Coat of arms
- Location of Mazangé
- Location within France Location within Centre-Val de Loire
- Coordinates: 47°49′29″N 0°56′47″E
- Country: France
- Region: Centre-Val de Loire
- Department: Loir-et-Cher
- Arrondissement: Vendôme
- Canton: Vendôme
- Intercommunality: CA Territoires Vendômois

Government
  - Mayor (2020–2026): Patrick Brionne
- Area^{1}: 24.26 km^{2} (9.37 sq mi)
- Elevation: 101 m (331 ft)
- Highest elevation: 156 m (512 ft)
- Lowest elevation: 71 m (233 ft)
- Population (2023): 809
  - Density: 33.3/km^{2} (86.4/sq mi)
- Time zone: UTC+01:00 (CET)
  - Summer (DST): UTC+02:00 (CEST)
- INSEE/Postal code: 41131 /41100
- ^{1} French Land Register data, which excludes lakes, ponds, glaciers > 1 km^{2} (0.386 sq mi or 247 acres) and river estuaries.

Mazangé (French pronunciation: [mazɑ̃ʒe]) is a commune in the Loir-et-Cher department of central France.

== Population ==
Historical population
Year	Pop.	±% p.a.
1968	715	—
1975	624	−1.93%
1982	695	+1.55%
1990	758	+1.09%
1999	838	+1.12%
2007	920	+1.17%
2012	911	−0.20%
2017	855	−1.26%
2023	809	−0.92%
Source: INSEE

== See also ==
- Communes of the Loir-et-Cher department
