= Stéphane Baudu =

French politician

Member of the National Assembly for Loir-et-Cher's 1st constituency
- In office 17 November 2018 – 27 July 2021
- Preceded by: Marc Fesneau
- Succeeded by: To be elected

Personal details
- Born: 1 May 1956 (age 69) Blois, Loir-et-Cher, France
- Party: MoDem

Stéphane Baudu (born 1 May 1956) is a French politician from the Democratic Movement. He was Member of Parliament for Loir-et-Cher's 1st constituency from 2018 to 2021.

== Political career ==
He was the substitute candidate for Marc Fesneau in the 2017 election.

In the 2021 departmental elections he was elected to the Departmental Council of Loir-et-Cher and had to resign from Parliament due to the dual mandate.
