= Cantons of the Loir-et-Cher department =

The following is a list of the 15 cantons of the Loir-et-Cher department, in France, following the French canton reorganisation which came into effect in March 2015:

- La Beauce
- Blois-1
- Blois-2
- Blois-3
- Chambord
- Montoire-sur-le-Loir
- Montrichard Val de Cher
- Le Perche
- Romorantin-Lanthenay
- Saint-Aignan
- Selles-sur-Cher
- La Sologne
- Vendôme
- Veuzain-sur-Loire
- Vineuil
