= Pascal Brindeau =

French politician (born 1974)

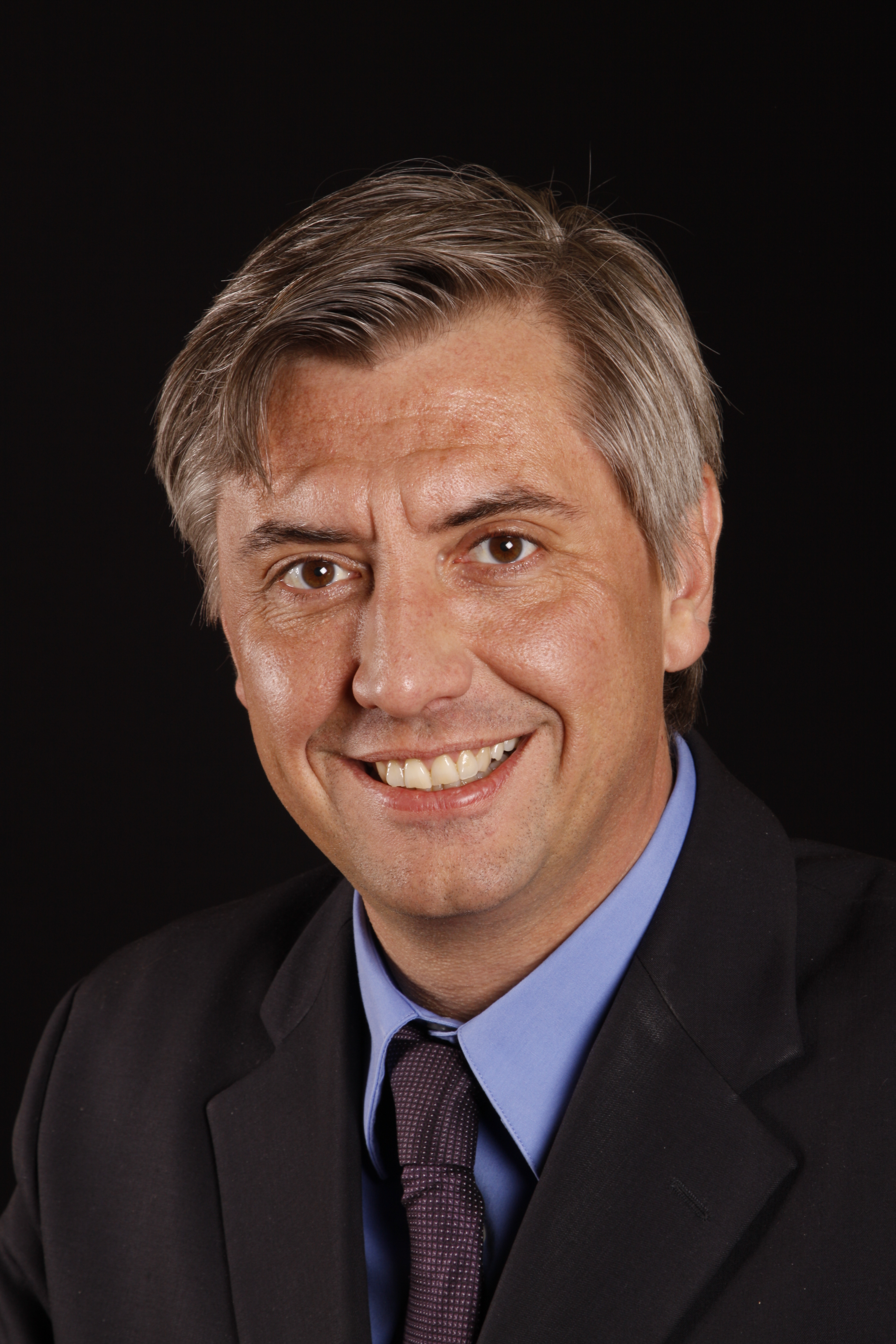

Member of the National Assembly for Loir-et-Cher's 3rd constituency
- In office 10 January 2019 – June 2022
- Preceded by: Maurice Leroy
- In office 15 December 2010 – 16 June 2012
- Preceded by: Maurice Leroy
- Succeeded by: Maurice Leroy

Personal details
- Born: 20 June 1974 (age 51) Vendôme, Loir-et-Cher, France
- Party: Union of Democrats and Independents
- Website: Official website

Pascal Brindeau (born 20 June 1974) is a French politician. He is Member of Parliament for Loir-et-Cher's 3rd constituency since 2019, after serving a previous term for the same seat between 2010 and 2012.

He lost his seat in the first round of the 2022 French legislative election.

== Biography ==
A lawyer and graduate of Paris 2 University, he was parliamentary attaché to Maurice Leroy from 1997 to 2004 before working at the Loir-et-Cher General Council, in the president's office, in the general services department as a project manager, then in the communications department, where he was responsible for press relations until December 5, 2010.

A municipal councilor in Vendôme from 2001 to 2014, he was elected as Maurice Leroy alternate in the 2007 legislative elections and became representative of the 3rd district on December 15, 2010, replacing Leroy, who was appointed Minister of Urban Affairs in François Fillon third government. In this capacity, he wrote a report on age management in the civil service.

He supports Jean-Louis Borloo candidacy in the 2012 presidential election.

Maurice Leroy was re-elected representative of the third district following the 2012 legislative elections, with Pascal Brindeau once again becoming his deputy.

On March 30, 2014, the “Vendôme” list , led by Pascal Brindeau, won 51.89% of the vote in the second round, against the list led by the outgoing mayor (PS), Catherine Lockhart, who obtained 37.83%, and the Front National list led by Renaud Grazioli, which won 10.28% of the vote. He was elected mayor of Vendôme on April 4, 2014.

He was appointed secretary for civil service issues within the UDI's national office in June 2018.

Following the resignation of Maurice Leroy and as his substitute, he returned to the National Assembly on January 10, 2019. In addition, in order to comply with the law on the non-accumulation of mandates, he resigned from his positions as mayor and president of the urban community. His successors were elected on January 31 and February 2, 2019, respectively.

In July 2020, he was the only UDI deputy to vote against the new Castex government.

He was appointed spokesperson for the UDI in the fall of 2020.

From February to September 2020, he served as rapporteur for the parliamentary commission of inquiry into social security fraud. In his report, he denounced fraud amounting to as much as €45 billion per year.

A candidate for deputy in 2022, he was eliminated in the first round behind Marine Bardet (National Rally) and Christophe Marion (Ensemble), who was elected deputy for the 3rd constituency of Loir-et-Cher.

In 2024, disagreeing with the UDI's electoral alliance with Macron's party Ensemble pour la République in the European elections and then in the legislative elections called after the dissolution, he left the center-right party and created Territoires & République, a political group that intends to participate in the rebuilding of the right and center.
