= Jean Desanlis =

French politician (1925–2023)

Deputy of the French National Assembly
- In office 14 April 1972 – 21 April 1997
- Preceded by: Paul Cormier
- Succeeded by: Maurice Leroy
- Constituency: Loir-et-Cher's 3rd constituency (1972–1986, 1986–1997); Proportional representation (1986–1988)

Personal details
- Born: 5 September 1925 Montloué, France
- Died: 5 February 2023 (aged 97) Brittany, France
- Party: UDF
- Education: École nationale vétérinaire d'Alfort
- Occupation: Veterinarian

Jean Desanlis (5 September 1925 – 5 February 2023) was a French veterinarian and politician.

== Biography ==
Born in Montloué on 5 September 1925, Desanlis attended the École nationale vétérinaire d'Alfort until 1950. He then began a veterinary practice in Montoire before moving to Vendôme in June 1951.

Desanlis was first elected to the municipal council of Vendôme in 1959. In 1973, he was elected General Councillor of the Canton of Saint-Amand-Longpré. He was re-elected in 1982, having become vice-president of the General Council in 1976. In 1973 French legislative election, he was elected as a deputy of the National Assembly for Loir-et-Cher's 3rd constituency, a position he served until 1997. He was a signatory of the Appel des 43, announcing his support for Valéry Giscard d'Estaing in the 1974 French presidential election.

Jean Desanlis died in Brittany on 5 February 2023, at the age of 97.
