= Azé, Loir-et-Cher =

Azé
- Commune
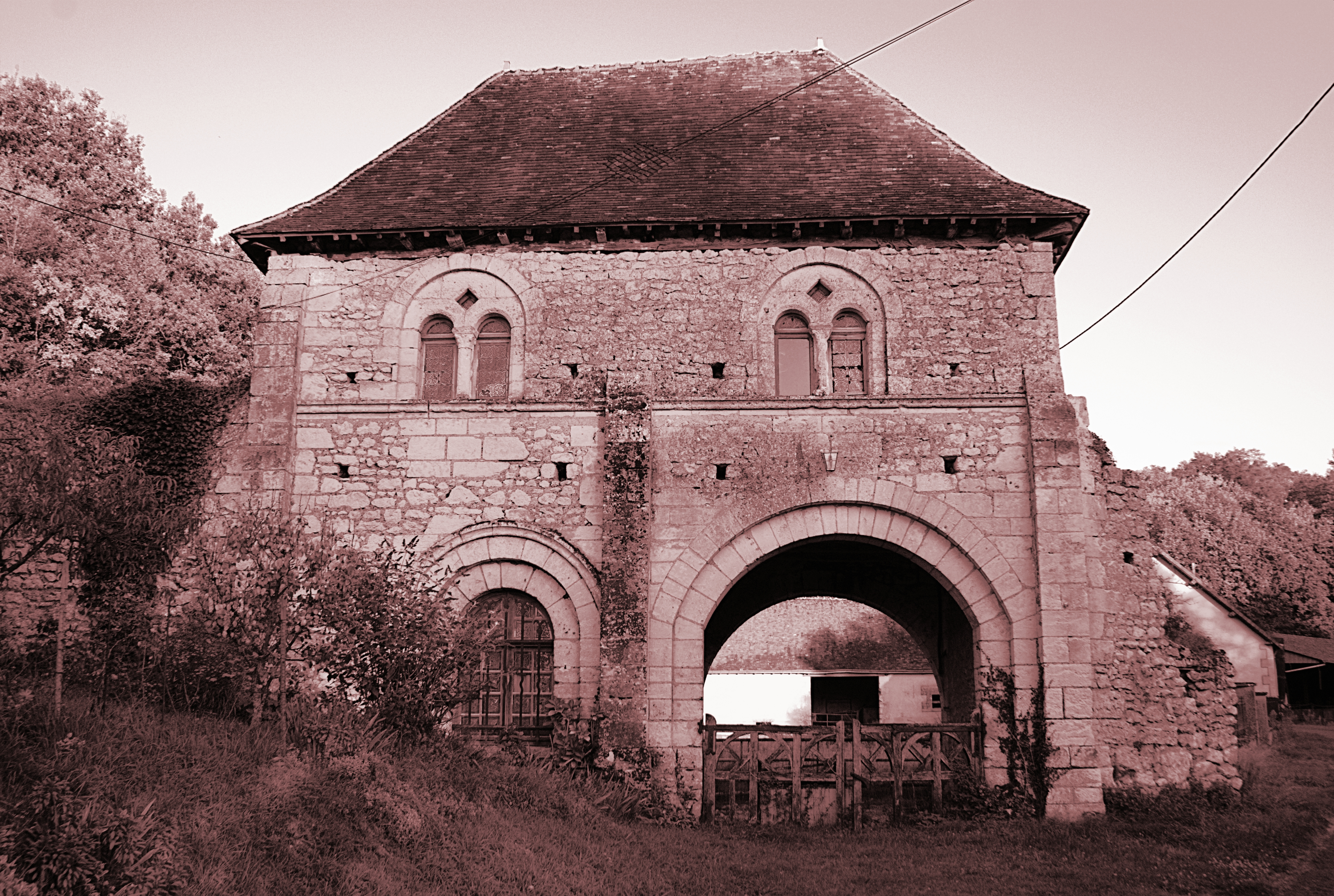
- Priory of Courtoze

- Coat of arms
- Location of Azé
- Location within France Location within Centre-Val de Loire
- Coordinates: 47°51′07″N 0°59′56″E
- Country: France
- Region: Centre-Val de Loire
- Department: Loir-et-Cher
- Arrondissement: Vendôme
- Canton: Vendôme
- Intercommunality: CA Territoires Vendômois

Government
  - Mayor (2020–2026): Maryvonne Boulay
- Area^{1}: 31.93 km^{2} (12.33 sq mi)
- Elevation: 81 m (266 ft)
- Highest elevation: 154 m (505 ft)
- Lowest elevation: 80 m (260 ft)
- Population (2023): 971
  - Density: 30.4/km^{2} (78.8/sq mi)
- Time zone: UTC+01:00 (CET)
  - Summer (DST): UTC+02:00 (CEST)
- INSEE/Postal code: 41010 /41100
- ^{1} French Land Register data, which excludes lakes, ponds, glaciers > 1 km^{2} (0.386 sq mi or 247 acres) and river estuaries.

Azé (French pronunciation: [aze]) is a commune in the Loir-et-Cher department in central France.

== Population ==
Historical population
Year	Pop.	±% p.a.
1968	714	—
1975	675	−0.80%
1982	662	−0.28%
1990	820	+2.71%
1999	985	+2.06%
2007	1,104	+1.44%
2012	1,107	+0.05%
2017	1,033	−1.37%
2023	971	−1.03%
Source: INSEE

== See also ==
- Communes of the Loir-et-Cher department
