= Christophe Marion =

French historian and politician (born 1973)

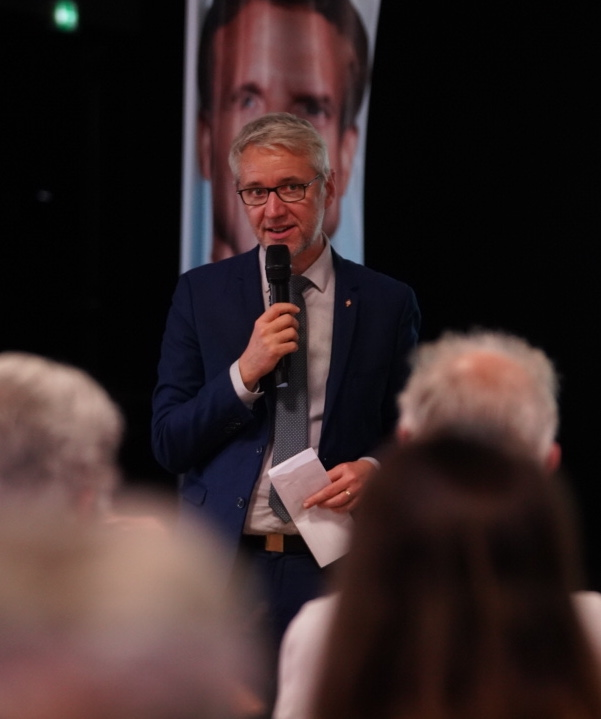
- Marion in 2022

Member of the National Assembly for Loir-et-Cher's 3rd constituency
- Incumbent
- Assumed office 22 June 2022
- Preceded by: Pascal Brindeau

Mayor of Saint-Ouen
- In office 15 March 2020 – 19 June 2022
- Preceded by: Jean Perroche
- Succeeded by: Jeannine Vaillant

Personal details
- Born: 25 April 1973 (age 52) Vendôme, France
- Party: Renaissance (2016–present)
- Other political affiliations: Socialist Party (1995–2017)

Christophe Marion (French pronunciation: [kʁistɔf maʁjɔ̃]; born 25 April 1973) is a French historian and politician who has represented the 3rd constituency of the Loir-et-Cher department in the National Assembly since 2022. A member of Renaissance (RE), he previously held the mayorship of Saint-Ouen from 2020 to 2022.

== Biography ==
=== Career ===
A native of Vendôme, Marion holds an agrégation in history (1996), and was a secondary school teacher before joining the Institut européen d'histoire et des cultures de l'alimentation (IEHCA) at the Université François-Rabelais de Tours.

After holding cabinet positions with the President of the Regional Council of Centre, François Bonneau, and then with the President of the Université François-Rabelais, Loïc Vaillant, he headed the "Métiers" department of the Agence de mutualisation des universités et des établissements (AMUE).

In 2017, he became general delegate of the Comité des travaux histoires et scientifiques (CTHS), an institute attached to the École nationale des chartes. He is also scientific delegate in charge of coordinating research activities at the same school.

=== Political career ===
Christophe Marion began his political career in Vendôme by becoming a local councillor on the list of then Socialist mayor Daniel Chanet in 1995.

He then ran for the Socialist Party on several occasions in Vendôme: in 2011, in the cantonal elections; in 2012, as Karine Gloanec Maurin's deputy in the legislative elections; in 2014, in the municipal elections in Saint-Ouen, Loir-et-Cher on Jean Perroche's list; in 2015, in the departmental elections in tandem with Charlotte Colas. He joined En Marche in 2016.

From 2014 to 2020, he was the deputy mayor of Saint-Ouen in charge of finance, and a community councillor for the Communauté d'agglomération Territoires vendômois. He became mayor of Saint-Ouen in 2020, as well as 4th vice-president of the Territoires vendômois agglomeration community.

In 2021, he took part in the regional elections in Centre-Val de Loire on the "Ensemble le meilleur est avenir" list led by Marc Fesneau.

In the 2022 legislative elections, Marion stood as a candidate in the 3rd constituency of Loir-et-Cher for La République En Marche! (later Renaissance) and the Ensemble presidential coalition. He was elected deputy in the second round, defeating National Rally candidate Marine Bardet with 55.2% of the vote.

He is currently a member of the Renaissance group in the National Assembly, where he sits on the Committee for Cultural Affairs and Education.
