= Meslay =

There are communes that have the name Meslay in France:

- Meslay, Calvados, in the Calvados département
- Meslay, Loir-et-Cher, in the Loir-et-Cher département
- Meslay-du-Maine, in the Mayenne département
- Meslay-le-Grenet, in the Eure-et-Loir département
- Meslay-le-Vidame, in the Eure-et-Loir département
