= Maurice Leroy =

French politician

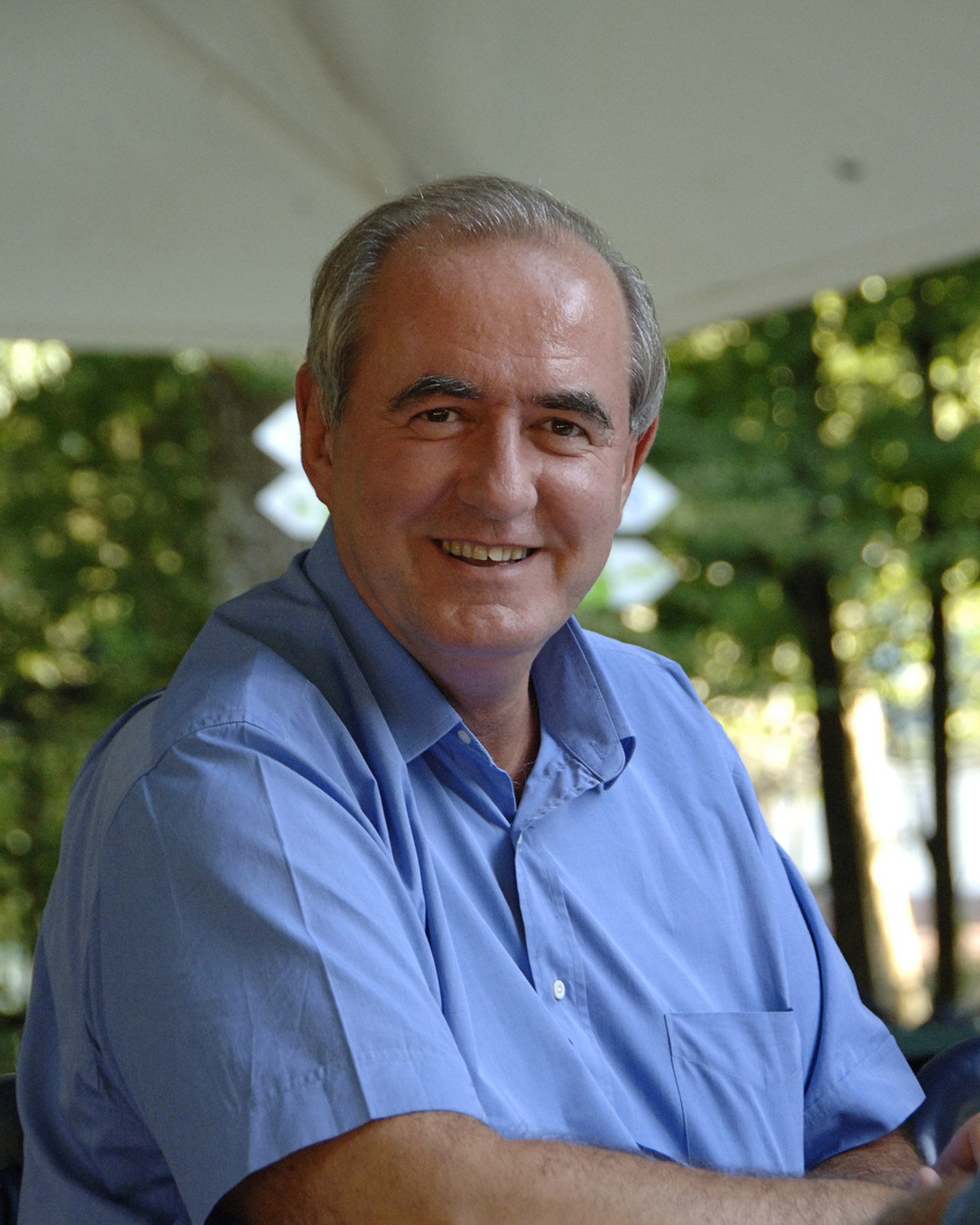
- Maurice Leroy in 2009

Minister of City
- In office 14 November 2010 – 16 May 2012
- President: Nicolas Sarkozy
- Prime Minister: François Fillon
- Preceded by: Fadela Amara
- Succeeded by: François Lamy

Member of the National Assembly for Loir-et-Cher's 3rd constituency
- In office 12 June 1997 – 9 January 2019
- Preceded by: Jean Desanlis
- Succeeded by: Pascal Brindeau

Personal details
- Born: 2 February 1959 (age 67) Paris, France
- Party: UDI
- Education: University of Paris 13

Maurice Leroy (French: [mɔʁis ləʁwa, moʁ-]; born 2 February 1959) is a French politician who served as Minister of City Affairs under President Nicolas Sarkozy in the third government of Prime Minister François Fillon from November 2010 to May 2012. In this capacity, he was in charge of the Grand Paris project.

He was a Member of Parliament from 1997 to 2010 and 2012 to 2019.

== Political career ==
From 1997 to 2010 and again from 2012 to 2019, Leroy was a member of the National Assembly of France, representing Loir-et-Cher's 3rd constituency. During that time, he was a member of the Union of Democrats and Independents as a part of The Centrists. While in the opposition, he criticized the Socialist government for blocking necessary investments for the Grand Paris project.

In September 2012, Leroy became the spokesman of the Union of Democrats and Independents (UDI) created by Jean-Louis Borloo. He left the New Centre in conflict with his leader, Hervé Morin.

Ahead of the 2012 French presidential election, Leroy endorsed Nicolas Sarkozy as the center-right parties' joint candidate.

== Later career ==
After his resignation from parliament, Leroy accepted the offer by Mayor of Moscow Sergey Sobyanin to become deputy general manager of the state-owned company Mosinjproekt, in charge of managing projects of Greater Moscow, for a monthly salary of 10,000 euros.
