= Arrondissements of the Loir-et-Cher department =

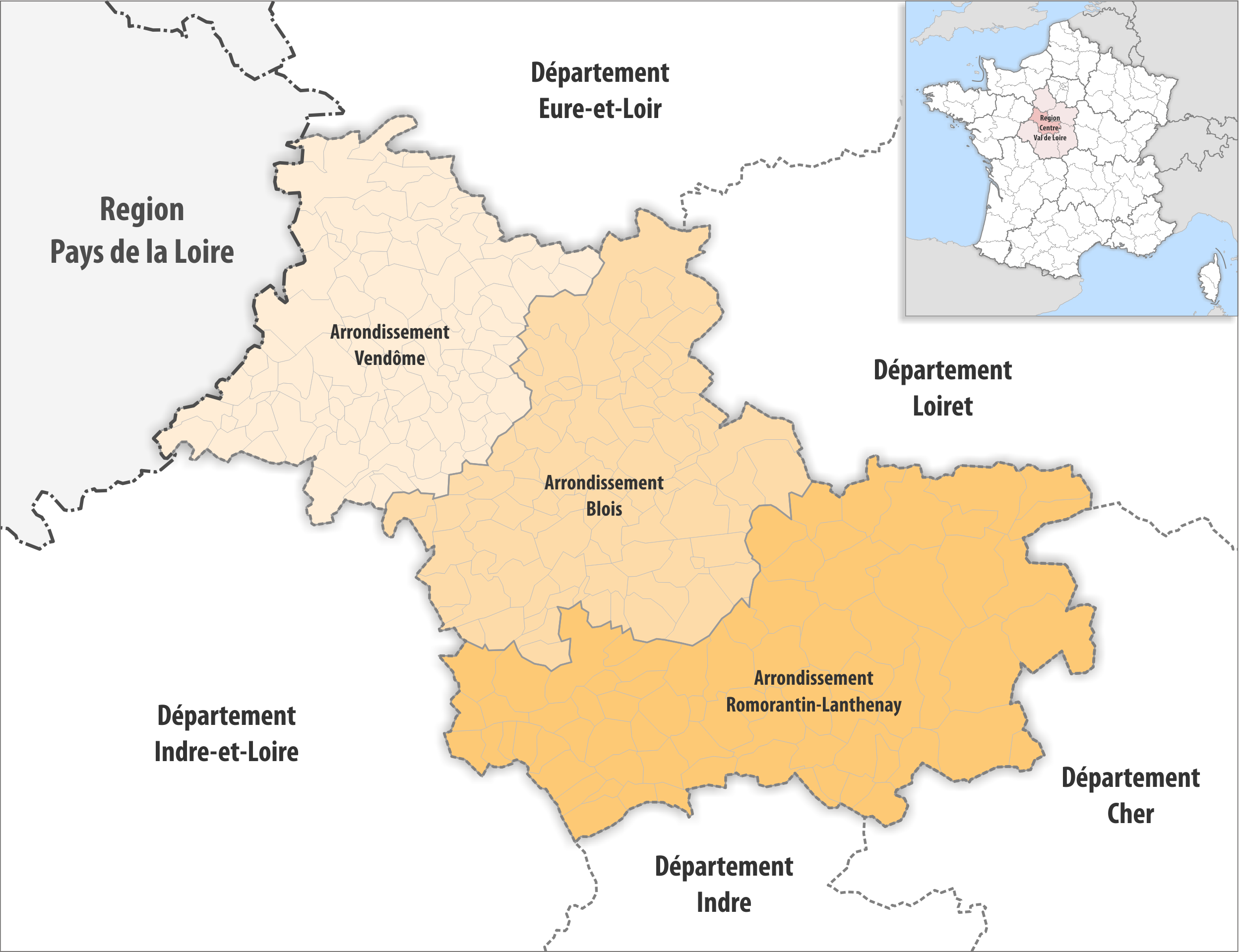
Map of arrondissements of the Loir-et-Cher department.

The 3 arrondissements of the Loir-et-Cher department are:

1. Arrondissement of Blois, (prefecture of the Loir-et-Cher department: Blois) with 93 communes. The population of the arrondissement was 151,096 in 2021.
2. Arrondissement of Romorantin-Lanthenay, (subprefecture: Romorantin-Lanthenay) with 74 communes. The population of the arrondissement was 110,000 in 2021.
3. Arrondissement of Vendôme, (subprefecture: Vendôme) with 100 communes. The population of the arrondissement was 67,408 in 2021.

== History ==
In 1800 the arrondissements of Blois, Romorantin and Vendôme were established. The arrondissement of Romorantin was disbanded in 1926, and restored in 1943. In 2007 the arrondissement of Blois lost the canton of Saint-Aignan to the arrondissement of Romorantin-Lanthenay.

The borders of the arrondissements of Loir-et-Cher were modified in January 2017:

- 17 communes from the arrondissement of Blois to the arrondissement of Romorantin-Lanthenay
- two communes from the arrondissement of Blois to the arrondissement of Vendôme
- three communes from the arrondissement of Romorantin-Lanthenay to the arrondissement of Blois
- four communes from the arrondissement of Vendôme to the arrondissement of Blois

In January 2019 the commune Courmemin passed from the arrondissement of Blois to the arrondissement of Romorantin-Lanthenay.
