= Patrick Mignola =

French politician (born 1971)

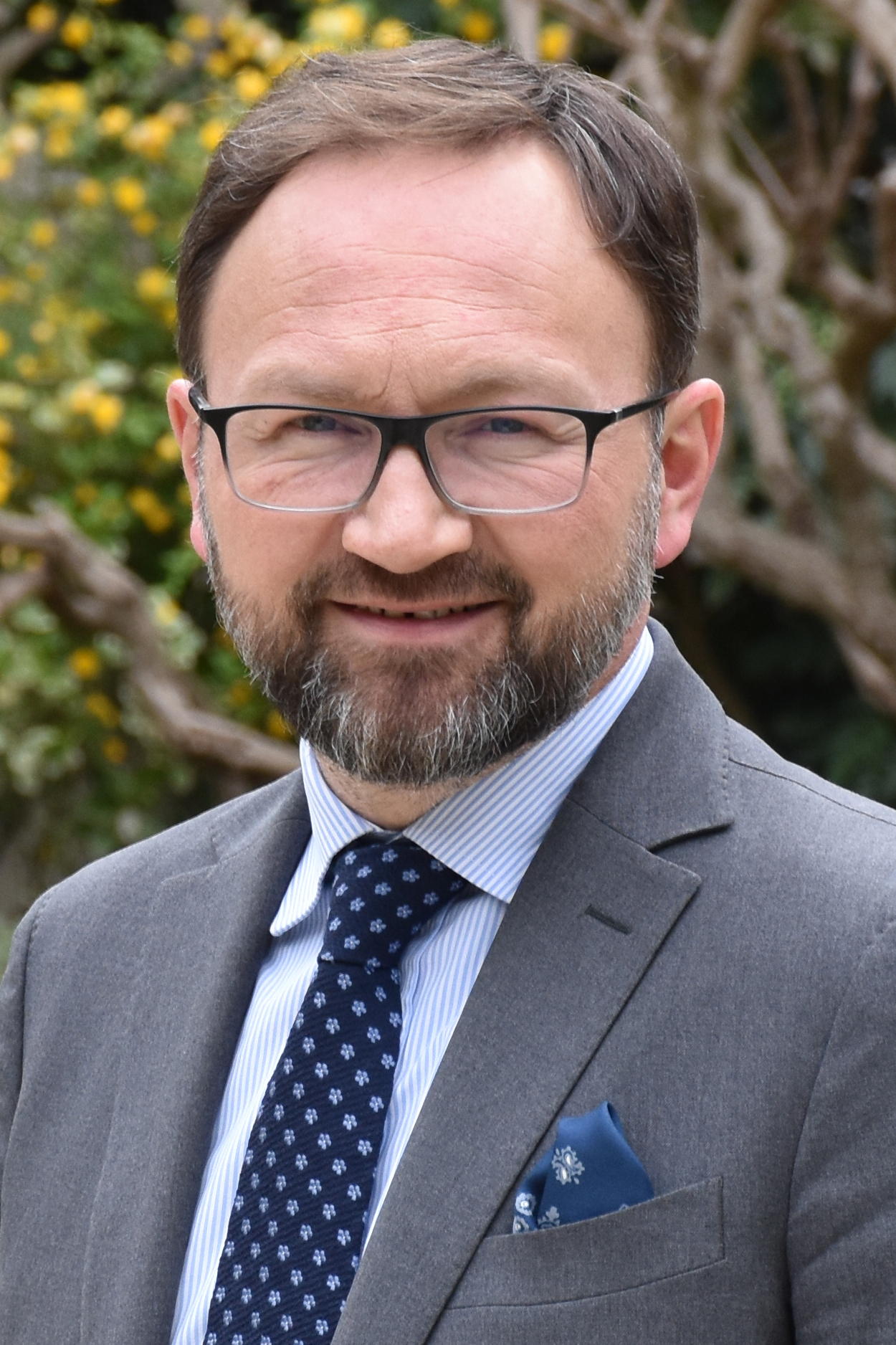

Minister Delegate for Relations with Parliament
- Incumbent
- Assumed office 23 December 2024
- Prime Minister: François Bayrou
- Preceded by: Nathalie Delattre

President of the Democratic Movement and affiliated democrats group in the National Assembly
- In office 17 October 2018 – 21 June 2022
- Preceded by: Marc Fesneau
- Succeeded by: Jean-Paul Mattei

Member of the National Assembly for Savoie's 4th constituency
- In office 21 June 2017 – 21 June 2022
- Preceded by: Bernadette Laclais
- Succeeded by: Jean-François Coulomme

Member of the Regional Council of Auvergne-Rhône-Alpes
- In office 4 January 2016 – 2 October 2017

Mayor of La Ravoire
- In office 11 March 2001 – 4 September 2017
- Preceded by: Jean Blanc
- Succeeded by: Frédéric Bret

General councillor of Savoie for the canton of La Ravoire
- In office 27 March 1998 – 30 March 2010
- Preceded by: Jean Blanc
- Succeeded by: Jean-Marc Léoutre

Personal details
- Born: 8 August 1971 (age 55) Chambéry, France
- Party: Democratic Movement (2007–present)
- Other political affiliations: Union for French Democracy (until 2007)
- Education: Sciences Po

Patrick Mignola (French pronunciation: [patʁik miɲɔla]; born 8 August 1971) is a French politician who has served as Minister Delegate for Relations with Parliament in the government of Prime Minister François Bayrou since December 2024. A member of the Democratic Movement (MoDem), he previously presided over the Democratic Movement and affiliated democrats group in the National Assembly from 2018 to 2022, where he represented the 4th constituency of the Savoie department from 2017 to 2022.

== Political career ==
Prior to his election to the National Assembly in 2017, Mignola served as Deputy Mayor of La Ravoire from 1995 and then won the mayorship in 2001. From 1998 to 2010, he was elected to the General Council of Savoie for the canton of La Ravoire. From 2016 to 2017, he also held one of the vice presidencies of the Regional Council of Auvergne-Rhône-Alpes under the presidency of Laurent Wauquiez.

In Parliament, Mignola served on the Committee on Sustainable Development and Spatial Planning. He also served as a member of the Finance Committee (2017–2018), the Committee on Social Affairs (2017–2020) and the Committee on Cultural Affairs and Education (2018–2019). In addition to his committee assignments, he was a member of the French-Italian Parliamentary Friendship Group.

When Marc Fesneau joined the government in October 2018, Mignola was elected to the presidency of the Democratic Movement and affiliated group. Under his leadership, the group grew in size as members of other groups joined the MoDem group.

In May 2022, Mignola – together with Stéphane Séjourné for the Renaissance and Gilles Boyer for Horizons – negotiated the agreement leading to the creation of Ensemble, a coalition of the parties forming the presidential majority, including on the financial distribution between them.

In the 2022 legislative election, Mignola ran for reelection but lost his seat against Jean-François Coulomme of La France Insoumise.

== Political positions ==
Together with Jean-Noël Barrot, Mignola proposed a law to introduce mail-in voting to facilitate voting during the public health crisis caused by the COVID-19 pandemic in France.

In early 2021, Mignola proposed the introduction of proportional representation for France's nine most populated departments in the country's electoral law ahead of the 2022 legislative election.
