= Meslay, Loir-et-Cher =

Meslay
- Commune
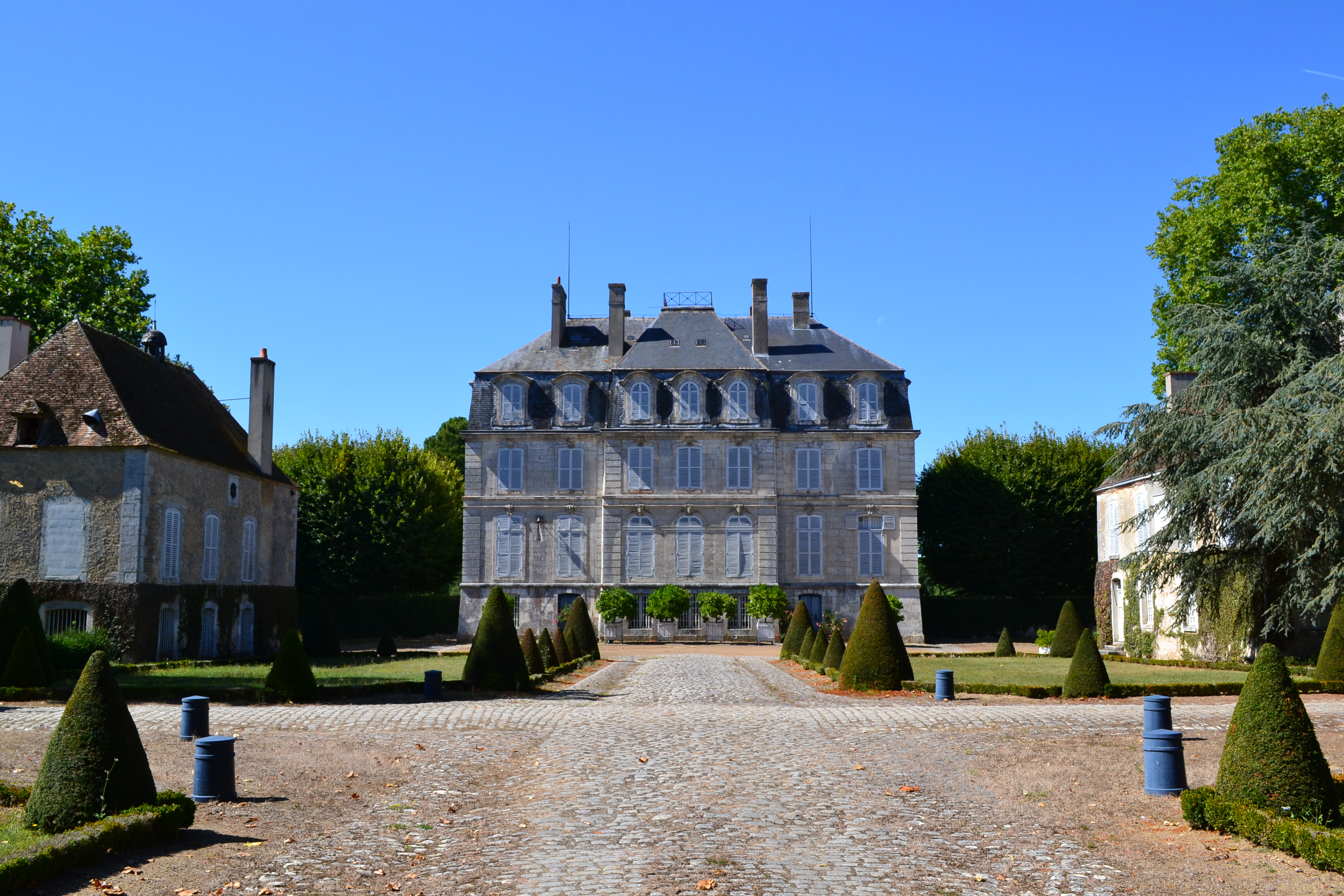
- Chateau

- Coat of arms
- Location of Meslay
- Location within France Location within Centre-Val de Loire
- Coordinates: 47°48′44″N 1°06′00″E
- Country: France
- Region: Centre-Val de Loire
- Department: Loir-et-Cher
- Arrondissement: Vendôme
- Canton: Vendôme
- Intercommunality: CA Territoires Vendômois

Government
  - Mayor (2020–2026): Jacky Foussard
- Area^{1}: 7.18 km^{2} (2.77 sq mi)
- Elevation: 83 m (272 ft)
- Highest elevation: 130 m (430 ft)
- Lowest elevation: 77 m (253 ft)
- Population (2023): 297
  - Density: 41.4/km^{2} (107/sq mi)
- Time zone: UTC+01:00 (CET)
  - Summer (DST): UTC+02:00 (CEST)
- INSEE/Postal code: 41138 /41100
- ^{1} French Land Register data, which excludes lakes, ponds, glaciers > 1 km^{2} (0.386 sq mi or 247 acres) and river estuaries.

Meslay (French pronunciation: [mɛlɛ]) is a commune in the Loir-et-Cher department of central France.

== Population ==
Historical population
Year	Pop.	±% p.a.
1968	233	—
1975	225	−0.50%
1982	344	+6.25%
1990	329	−0.56%
1999	294	−1.24%
2007	300	+0.25%
2012	304	+0.27%
2017	312	+0.52%
2023	297	−0.82%
Source: INSEE

== See also ==
- Communes of the Loir-et-Cher department
