= Loir-et-Cher's 1st constituency =

Constituency of the National Assembly of France

1st constituency of Loir-et-Cher
- inline Constituency of the National Assembly of France

- Constituency in Department

- Loir-et-Cher in France
- Deputy: Marc Fesneau; MoDem
- Department: Loir-et-Cher
- Cantons: (pre-2015) Blois-1, Blois-2, Blois-3, Blois-4, Blois-5, Contres, Montrichard, Vineuil
- Registered voters: 119,021

The 1st constituency of the Loir-et-Cher is a French legislative constituency in the department of Loir-et-Cher.

== Deputies ==
Election	Member	Party	
1988	Jack Lang	PS	
1993	Jack Lang	PS	
1997	Jack Lang	PS	
2002	Nicolas Perruchot	UDF	
2007	Nicolas Perruchot	LC	
2012	Denys Robiliard	PS	
2017	Marc Fesneau	MoDem	Appointed Minister in charge of relations with Parliament and replaced by his substitute (suppléant), Stéphane Baudu, in November 2018
2018	Stéphane Baudu	MoDem	
2022	Marc Fesneau	MoDem	
2024	Marc Fesneau	MoDem	

== Election results ==
=== 2024 ===
Candidate	Party	Alliance	First round			Second round		
Candidate	Party	Alliance	Votes	%	+/–	Votes	%	+/–
Marine Bardet	RN		19,069	35.22	+12.88	21,381	39.80	new
Marc Fesneau	MoDEM	Ensemble	18,711	34.56	+2.59	32,336	60.20	+3.73
Reda Belkadi	DVG		8,311	15.35	-8.96			
Pierre Gilles Parra	LR	UDC	3,220	5.95	-1.47			
Gildas Vieira	DIV		2,867	5.29	+1.63			
Alain Lombard	LO		1,828	3.38	+2.17			
François Dassonneville	DIV		138	0.25	new			
Jean-Marc Tran	DIV		4	0.01	new			
Votes			54,153	100.00		53,717	100.00	
Valid votes			54,153	96.96	-0.80	53,717	94.83	+4.55
Blank votes			1,221	2.19	+0.63	2,147	3.79	-2.89
Null votes			478	0.86	+0.18	781	1.38	-1.66
Turnout			55,852	67.53	+17.33	56,645	68.43	+20.46
Abstentions			26,854	32.47	-17.33	26,130	31.57	-20.46
Registered voters			82,706			82,775		
Result			MoDEM HOLD					

=== 2022 ===
Legislative Election 2022: Loir-et-Cher's 1st constituency
Party	Candidate	Votes	%	±%
MoDem (Ensemble)	Marc Fesneau	12,986	31.97	-2.62
LFI (NUPÉS)	Reda Belkabi	9,873	24.31	-4.63
RN	Michel Chassier	9,073	22.34	+7.30
LR (UDC)	Malik Benakcha	3,015	7.42	−5.79
REC	Frank Martin	1,828	4.50	N/A
DVE	Gildas Vieira	1,488	3.66	N/A
PRG	Hervé Mesnager	1,299	3.20	N/A
PA	Fabienne Pomi	569	1.4	N/A
LO	Alain Lombard	490	1.21	+0.42
Turnout		40,621	50.20	+0.01
2nd round result
MoDem (Ensemble)	Marc Fesneau	20,249	56.47	-12.68
LFI (NUPÉS)	Reda Belkadi	15,606	43.53	N/A
Turnout		35,855	47.97	+4.90
MoDem hold				

=== 2017 ===
Candidate	Label	First round		Second round	
Candidate	Label	Votes	%	Votes	%
Marc Fesneau	MoDem	14,076	34.59	22,914	69.15
Michel Chassier	FN	6,121	15.04	10,221	30.85
Denys Robiliard	PS	5,634	13.85		
Damien Henault	LR	5,374	13.21		
Kenza Belliard	FI	4,302	10.57		
Rama Yade	DVD	2,300	5.65		
Nicolas Orgelet	EELV	1,148	2.82		
Camélia Khabèche	PCF	692	1.70		
Étienne Bourgeois	ECO	447	1.10		
Marie-Claude Neveu	EXG	320	0.79		
Rémy Meneau	DIV	275	0.68		
Votes		40,689	100.00	33,135	100.00
Valid votes		40,689	97.96	33,135	88.84
Blank votes		625	1.50	3,092	8.29
Null votes		221	0.53	1,071	2.87
Turnout		41,535	50.19	37,298	45.07
Abstentions		41,224	49.81	45,454	54.93
Registered voters		82,759		82,752	
Source: Ministry of the Interior

=== 2012 ===
2012 legislative election in Loir-Et-Cher's 1st constituency
Candidate	Party	First round		Second round	
Candidate	Party	Votes	%	Votes	%
Denys Robiliard	PS	17,278	37.27%	23,972	51.90%
Nicolas Perruchot	NC	16,136	34.80%	22,215	48.10%
Michel Chassier	FN	6,607	14.25%		
Laurianne Delaporte	FG	2,367	5.11%		
François Thiollet	EELV	1,601	3.45%		
Elisabeth Montandon	UDN	539	1.16%		
Laurent Guibert	DLR	446	0.96%		
Marie-Anne Clement	NPA	357	0.77%		
Sarah Laurent	??	355	0.77%		
Hélène Gilot	MPF	272	0.59%		
Etienne Bourgeois	AEI	215	0.46%		
Alain Lombard	LO	189	0.41%		
Valid votes		46,362	98.54%	46,187	96.85%
Spoilt and null votes		686	1.46%	1,504	3.15%
Votes cast / turnout		47,048	58.45%	47,691	59.25%
Abstentions		33,442	41.55%	32,804	40.75%
Registered voters		80,490	100.00%	80,495	100.00%

=== 2007 ===
Legislative Election 2007: Loir-et-Cher's 1st constituency
Party	Candidate	Votes	%	±%
NM	Nicolas Perruchot	22,932	42.34	N/A
PS	Geneviève Baraban	16,388	30.25	−3.10
FN	Miguel de Peyrecave	4,043	7.46	−3.88
LV	Catherine Fourmond	2,619	4.84	+1.73
LCR	Marie-Anne Clement	2,002	3.70	+2.04
MPF	Virginie Lacaille	1,900	3.51	+2.03
PCF	Laurianne Delaporte	1,698	3.13	+0.33
CPNT	Emmanuelle Faure	1,025	1.89	+0.18
DVE	Sarah Laurent	908	1.68	N/A
LO	Maryline Kergreis	652	1.20	−0.05
Turnout		55,678	61.45	−3.93
Registered electors		90,614		
2nd round result
NM	Nicolas Perruchot	26,418	50.31	N/A
PS	Geneviève Baraban	26,097	49.69	+0.29
Turnout		54,693	60.36	−1.84
Registered electors		90,614		
NM gain from UDF				

=== 2002 ===
Legislative Election 2002: Loir-et-Cher's 1st constituency
Party	Candidate	Votes	%	±%
UDF	Nicolas Perruchot	21,133	38.03	+9.57
PS	Michel Fromet	18,536	33.35	−0.58
FN	Miguel de Peyrecave	7,411	13.34	−2.82
LV	Nicole Combredet	1,728	3.11	−2.82
PCF	Jean-Louis Lemoing	1,555	2.80	−5.40
Others	N/A	5,212	-	−
Turnout		56,754	65.38	−4.56
Registered electors		86,801		
2nd round result
UDF	Nicolas Perruchot	26,238	50.60	+3.79
PS	Michel Fromet	25,616	49.40	−3.79
Turnout		53,993	62.20	−10.98
Registered electors		86,800		
UDF gain from PS				

=== 1997 ===
Legislative Election 1997: Loir-et-Cher's 1st constituency
Party	Candidate	Votes	%	±%
PS	Jack Lang	18,923	33.93	−0.44
FD (UDF)	Jacqueline Gourault	15,869	28.45	-6.45
FN	Miguel de Peyrecave	9,011	16.16	+5.26
PCF	Jean-Louis Le Moing	4,572	8.20	+1.55
LV	Jean-François Dutheil	3,307	5.93	−0.52
LDI	Marie Thouard-Fontagné	2,266	4.06	N/A
MEI	Nicole Combredet	1,053	1.89	N/A
DVG	Jean-Marc Richez	769	1.38	N/A
Turnout		58,823	69.94	−4.40
Registered electors		84,104		
2nd round result
PS	Jack Lang	30,519	53.19	+1.77
FD (UDF)	Jacqueline Gourault	26,860	46.81	−1.77
Turnout		61,547	73.18	−3.64
Registered electors		84,104		
PS hold				

=== 1993 ===
Legislative Election 1993: Loir-et-Cher's 1st constituency
Party	Candidate	Votes	%	±%
UDF	Jacqueline Gourault	20,298	34.90	
PS	Jack Lang	19,991	34.37	
FN	Paul Pelletier	6,342	10.90	
PCF	Jean-Louis Le Moing	3,868	6.65	
LV	Nicole Combredet	3,752	6.45	
DVD	Jacky Desforges	2,079	3.57	
NERNA	Paul Boghossian	1,366	2.35	
DVD	Olivier Bondois	462	0.79	
Turnout		58,158	74.34	
Registered electors		82,015		
2nd round result
PS	Jack Lang	30,790	51.42	
UDF	Jacqueline Gourault	29,091	48.58	
Turnout		59,881	76.82	
Registered electors		63,005		
PS hold				

== Sources ==
- "Résultats électoraux officiels en France" (in French). 2017.
- "Résultats des élections législatives 2012" [Results of 2012 Legislative Election] (in French). Ministry of the Interior.
