= Canton of Vendôme =

Administrative division of Loir-et-Cher, France

Coordinates: 47.79°N 1.07°E

A map of the canton of Vendôme in the Loir-et-Cher department

The canton of Vendôme (French: Canton de Vendôme) is a canton (an administrative division) of the Loir-et-Cher department, central France. Its seat is Vendôme. It was re-created at the canton reorganisation that came into effect in March 2015 – having previously existed until March 1982. Since then it elects two members of the Departmental Council of Loir-et-Cher.

== Composition ==
The canton of Vendôme consists of the following communes:

1. Areines
2. Azé
3. Mazangé
4. Meslay
5. Sainte-Anne
6. Saint-Ouen
7. Vendôme
8. Villiers-sur-Loir
