= Saint-Ouen, Loir-et-Cher =

Saint-Ouen
- Commune
- Coat of arms
- Location of Saint-Ouen
- Location within France Location within Centre-Val de Loire
- Coordinates: 47°48′42″N 1°05′06″E
- Country: France
- Region: Centre-Val de Loire
- Department: Loir-et-Cher
- Arrondissement: Vendôme
- Canton: Vendôme
- Intercommunality: CA Territoires Vendômois

Government
  - Mayor (2022–2026): Jeannine Vaillant
- Area^{1}: 11.3 km^{2} (4.4 sq mi)
- Elevation: 81 m (266 ft)
- Highest elevation: 140 m (460 ft)
- Lowest elevation: 77 m (253 ft)
- Population (2023): 3,041
  - Density: 269/km^{2} (697/sq mi)
- Time zone: UTC+01:00 (CET)
  - Summer (DST): UTC+02:00 (CEST)
- INSEE/Postal code: 41226 /41100
- ^{1} French Land Register data, which excludes lakes, ponds, glaciers > 1 km^{2} (0.386 sq mi or 247 acres) and river estuaries.

Saint-Ouen (French pronunciation: [sɛ̃.t‿wɛ̃]) is a commune in the Loir-et-Cher department in central France.

== Geography ==
Saint-Ouen is situated on the left bank of the Loir. The town of Saint-Ouen is bisected by the RN10, a highway that runs between Paris and Bordeaux.

== Population ==
Historical population

Year	Pop.	±% p.a.
1793	307	—
1821	347	+0.44%
1846	402	+0.59%
1872	508	+0.90%
1901	624	+0.71%
1926	700	+0.46%
1946	1,012	+1.86%
1962	1,248	+1.32%
1968	1,368	+1.54%

Year	Pop.	±% p.a.
1975	1,880	+4.65%
1982	2,359	+3.30%
1990	2,958	+2.87%
1999	3,050	+0.34%
2007	3,408	+1.40%
2012	3,372	−0.21%
2017	3,189	−1.11%
2023	3,041	−0.79%

Source: EHESS and INSEE (1968-2023)

== See also ==
- Communes of the Loir-et-Cher department
