= Jean-François Coulomme =

French politician (born 1966)

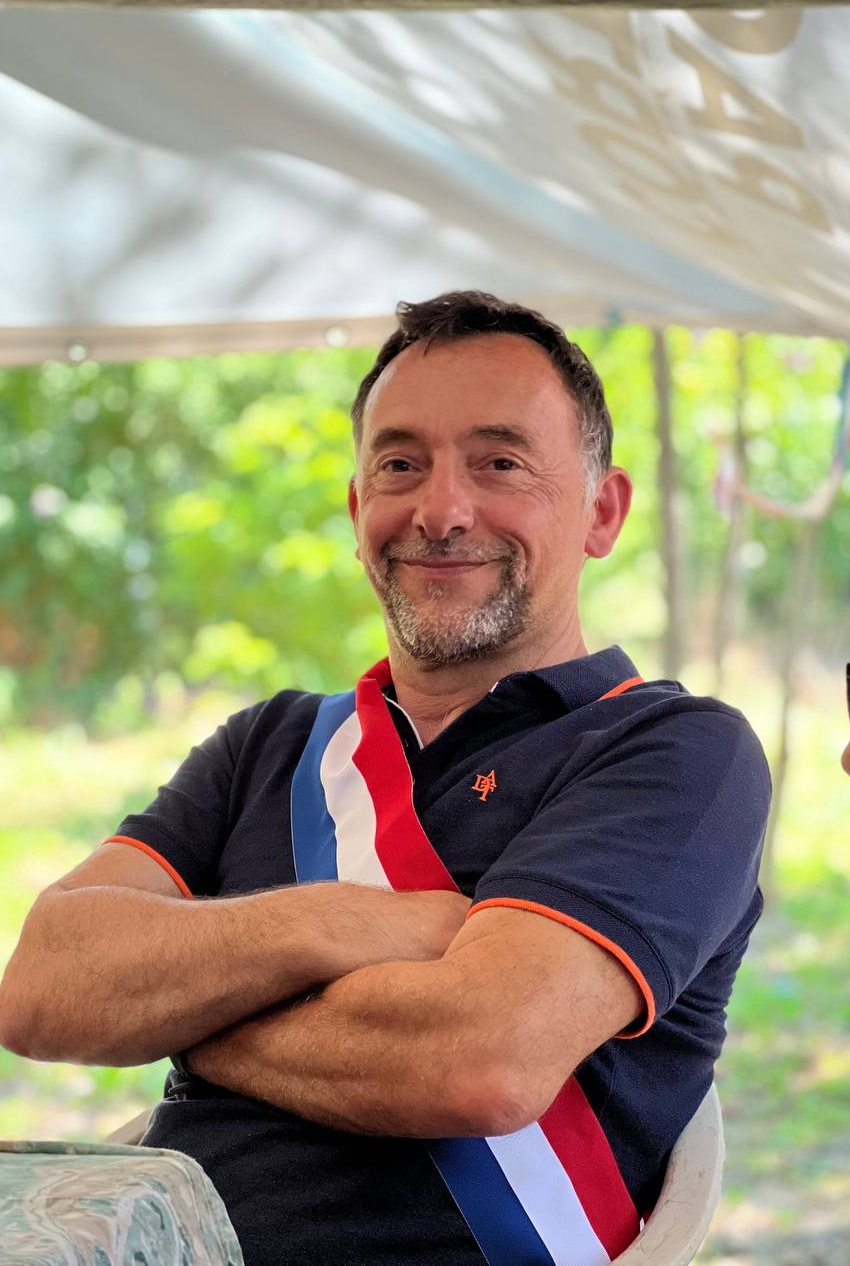

Member of the National Assembly for Savoie's 4th constituency
- Incumbent
- Assumed office 22 June 2022
- Preceded by: Patrick Mignola

Personal details
- Born: 1 April 1966 (age 60) Paris, France
- Party: La France Insoumise
- Other political affiliations: NUPES
- Occupation: politician

Jean-François Coulomme (French pronunciation: [ʒɑ̃ fʁɑ̃swa kulɔm]; born 1 April 1966) is a French politician from La France Insoumise (NUPES). He was elected member of the National Assembly in Savoie's 4th constituency in the 2022 French legislative election.

== Early life ==
Coulomme was born in Paris and is the grandson of Spanish refugees who fled the Spanish Civil War.

== See also ==
- List of deputies of the 16th National Assembly of France
