= Savoie's 4th constituency =

Constituency of the National Assembly of France

4th Constituency of Savoie
- inline Constituency of the National Assembly of France

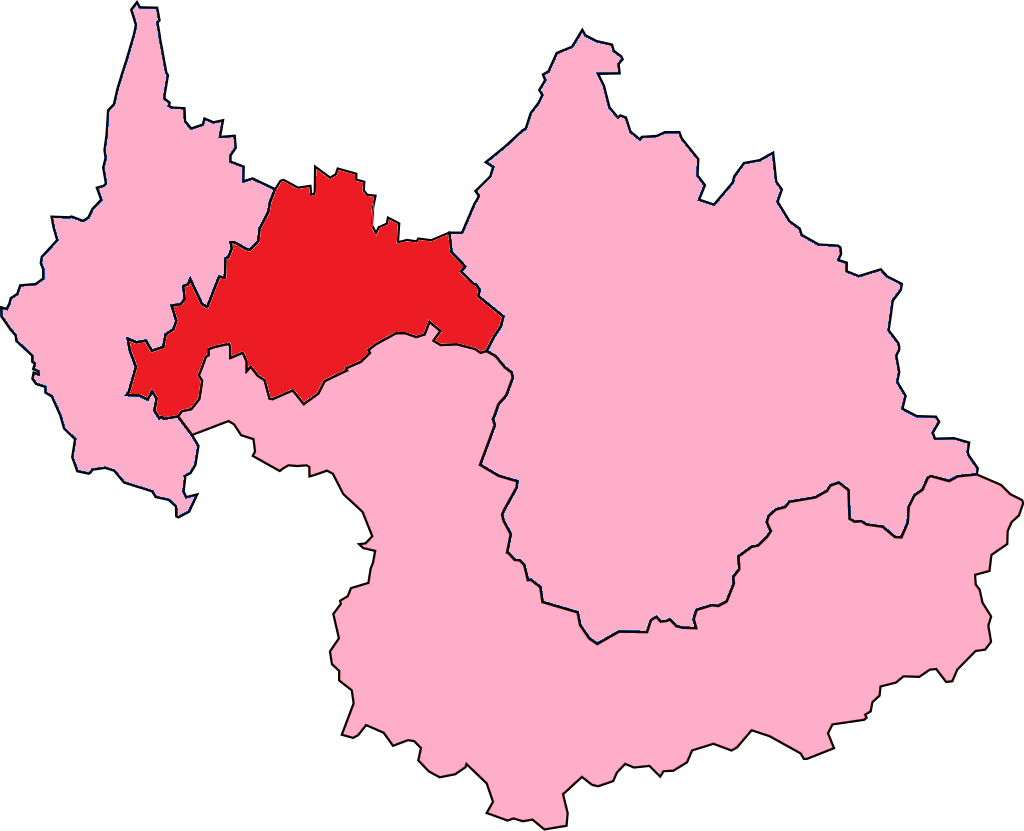
- Savoie's 4th Constituency shown within Savoie
- Deputy: Jean-François Coulomme; LFI
- Department: Savoie
- Cantons: Chambéry Est, Chambéry Nord, Chambéry Sud, Chambéry Sud-Ouest, Le Châtelard, Cognin, Grésy-sur-Isère, Saint-Alban-Leysse, Saint-Pierre-d'Albigny
- Registered voters: 74,639

The 4th constituency of the Savoie (French: Quatrième circonscription de la Savoie) is a French legislative constituency in the Savoie département. Like the other 576 French constituencies, it elects one MP using a two round electoral system.

== Description ==
The 4th constituency of Savoie was created in 2012 as a result of the 2010 redistricting of French legislative constituencies. The consists of Chambéry and some of its immediate hinterland in the north east of the department.

The constituency initially elected a Socialist Party deputy but she failed to win re-election in the face of Emmanuel Macron's centrist coalition in 2017.

== Assembly Members ==
Election	Member	Party
2012	Bernadette Laclais	PS
2017	Patrick Mignola	MoDem
2022	Jean-François Coulomme	LFI
2024	Jean-François Coulomme	LFI

== Election results ==
=== 2024 ===
Legislative Election 2024: Savoie's 4th constituency
Party	Candidate	Votes	%	±%
MoDem (Ensemble)	Anaïs Gomero	15,357	27.88	+1.67
LFI (NFP)	Jean-François Coulomme	20,164	36.61	+2.16
RN	Brice Bernard	16,698	30.31	+14.15
UDI	Vincent Bernollin	2	0.00	n/a
LO	Marie Ducruet	630	1.14	n/a
DLF	Vincent Thomazo	1,037	1.88	n/a
DIV	Albin Guillaud	1,194	2.17	n/a
Turnout		55,082	97.21	+45.81
Registered electors		79,612		
2nd round result
LFI	Jean-François Coulomme	29,313	59.02	+8.17
RN	Brice Bernard	20,354	40.98	n/a
Turnout		49,667	88.53	+39.25
Registered electors		79,636		
LFI hold		Swing		

=== 2022 ===
Legislative Election 2022: Savoie's 4th constituency
Party	Candidate	Votes	%	±%
LFI (NUPÉS)	Jean-François Coulomme	13,548	34.45	+9.88
MoDem (Ensemble)	Patrick Mignola	10,306	26.21	-2.05
RN	Rémi Garnier	6,354	16.16	+6.14
LR (UDC)	François Gaudin	3,995	10.16	−5.59
DVE	Mireille Bouvier	1,590	4.04	N/A
REC	Charles Gonzalez	1,363	3.47	N/A
DSV	David Mercier	928	2.36	N/A
Others	N/A	1,243	-	−
Turnout		39,327	51.40	+3.65
2nd round result
LFI (NUPÉS)	Jean-François Coulomme	18,083	50.85	N/A
MoDem (Ensemble)	Patrick Mignola	17,479	49.15	−6.56
Turnout		35,562	49.28	+17.31
LFI gain from MoDem				

=== 2017 ===
Legislative Election 2017: Savoie's 4th constituency
Party	Candidate	Votes	%	±%
MoDem	Patrick Mignola	10,077	28.28	
DVG	Bernadette Laclais	6,194	17.38	
LFI	Tiphaine Ducharne	4,872	13.67	
FN	Isabelle Fetu	3,570	10.02	
LR	Alexandra Turnar	3,133	8.79	
UDI	Christelle Favetta-Sieyes	2,480	6.96	
EELV	Yves Peutot	2,105	5.91	
PCF	Antoine Fatiga	1,778	4.99	
Others	N/A	1,429		
Turnout		35,638	47.75	
2nd round result
MoDem	Patrick Mignola	13,293	55.71	
DVG	Bernadette Laclais	10,568	44.29	
Turnout		23,861	31.97	
MoDem gain from PS				

=== 2012 ===
Legislative Election 2012: Savoie's 4th constituency
Party	Candidate	Votes	%	±%
PS	Bernadette Laclais	16,398	39.62	
DVD	Christiane Brunet	11,497	27.78	
FN	Joëlle Regairaz	6,151	14.86	
FG	Jean-Claude Bernard	2,816	6.80	
EELV	Carole Plassiard-Brunet	2,208	5.34	
Others	N/A	2,314		
Turnout		41,384	57.70	
2nd round result
PS	Bernadette Laclais	21,521	56.82	
DVD	Christiane Brunet	16,354	43.18	
Turnout		37,875	52.82	
PS win (new seat)				
