= Loir-et-Cher's 3rd constituency =

Constituency of the National Assembly of France

3rd constituency of Loir-et-Cher
- inline Constituency of the National Assembly of France

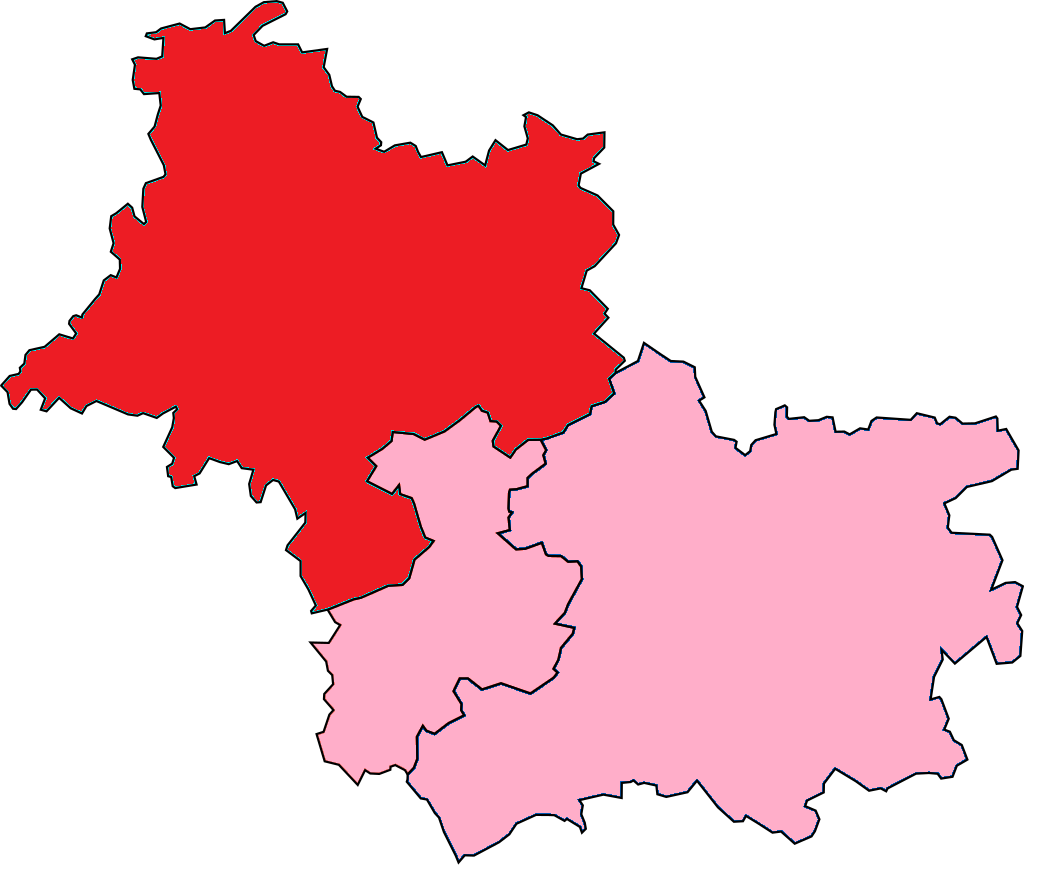
- Loir-et-Cher's 3rd Constituency shown within Loir-et-Cher

- Loir-et-Cher within France
- Deputy: Christophe Marion; RE
- Department: Loir-et-Cher
- Cantons: Droué, Herbault, Marchenoir, Mer, Mondoubleau, Montoire-sur-le-Loir, Morée, Ouzouer-le-Marché, Saint-Amand-Longpré, Savigny-sur-Braye, Selommes, Vendôme I, Vendôme II
- Registered voters: 93669

The 3rd constituency of the Loir-et-Cher (French: Troisième circonscription de Loir-et-Cher) is a French legislative constituency in the Seine-Maritime département. Like the other 576 French constituencies, it elects one MP using a two round electoral system.

== Description ==
The 3rd Constituency of the Loir-et-Cher covers the north west of the department including the medieval town of Vendôme on the Loir river.

The seat has consistently returned deputies from the centre right.

== Assembly Members ==
| Election | Member | Party |
|---|---|---|
| 1988 | Jean Desanlis | UDF |
| 1993 | Jean Desanlis | UDF |
| 1997 | Maurice Leroy | UDF |
| 2002 | Maurice Leroy | UDF |
| 2007 | Maurice Leroy | NC |
| 2010 | Pascal Brindeau | NC |
| 2012 | Maurice Leroy | NC |
| 2017 | Maurice Leroy | UDI |
| 2019 | Pascal Brindeau | UDI |
| 2022 | Christophe Marion | RE |
| 2024 | Christophe Marion | RE |

== Election results ==
=== 2024 ===
| Candidate | Party | Alliance | First round | | | Second round | | |
| Candidate | Party | Alliance | Votes | % | +/– | Votes | % | +/– |
|---|---|---|---|---|---|---|---|---|
| Virginia de Oliviera | RN | | 22,674 | 41.06 | +17.03 | 24,877 | 45.29 | +0.51 |
| Christophe Marion | REN | Ensemble | 20,014 | 36.25 | +11.71 | 30,055 | 54.71 | -0.51 |
| Noé Petit | LE | NFP | 10,795 | 19.55 | +0.25 | withdrew | | |
| Claude Lamy | LO | | 986 | 1.79 | +0.25 | | | |
| Alexandre Bonnassieux | REC | | 748 | 1.35 | -2.22 | | | |
| Votes | | | 55,225 | 100.00 | | 54,932 | 100.00 | |
| Valid votes | | | 55,225 | 96.93 | -0.53 | 54,932 | 95.30 | +3.80 |
| Blank votes | | | 1,190 | 2.09 | +0.29 | 1,981 | 3.44 | -3.00 |
| Null votes | | | 557 | 0.98 | +0.25 | 730 | 1.27 | -0.78 |
| Turnout | | | 56,972 | 70.29 | +17.44 | 57,643 | 71.12 | +20.00 |
| Abstentions | | | 24,082 | 9.71 | -17.44 | 23,412 | 28.88 | -20.00 |
| Registered voters | | | 81,054 | | | 81,055 | | |
| Result | | | RE HOLD | | | | | |

=== 2022 ===
Legislative Election 2022: Loir-et-Cher's 3rd constituency
| Party | Candidate | Votes | % | ±% |
|---|---|---|---|---|
| LREM (Ensemble) | Christophe Marion | 10,357 | 24.54 | -2.41 |
| RN | Marine Bardet | 10,141 | 24.03 | +9.30 |
| UDI (UDC) | Pascal Brindeau | 9,161 | 21.71 | −16.40 |
| EELV (NUPÉS) | Noé Petit | 8,144 | 19.30 | +0.74 |
| REC | Sabrine Huet | 1,508 | 3.57 | N/A |
| DVE | Dahbia Kermad | 918 | 2.18 | N/A |
| Others | N/A | 1,968 | - | − |
| Turnout | | 42,197 | 52.85 | −3.10 |
2nd round result
| LREM (Ensemble) | Christophe Marion | 21,161 | 55.22 | +16.18 |
| RN | Marine Bardet | 17,163 | 44.78 | N/A |
| Turnout | | 38,324 | 51.12 | +0.89 |
| LREM gain from UDI | | | | |

=== 2017 ===
| Candidate | Label | First round | | Second round | |
| Candidate | Label | Votes | % | Votes | % |
|---|---|---|---|---|---|
| Maurice Leroy | UDI | 17,175 | 38.11 | 23,088 | 60.96 |
| Marlène Martin | REM | 12,145 | 26.95 | 14,784 | 39.04 |
| Jean-Yves Narquin | FN | 6,637 | 14.73 | | |
| Cécile Rivière | FI | 4,089 | 9.07 | | |
| Christian Guellier | ECO | 2,660 | 5.90 | | |
| Patrick Callu | PCF | 1,618 | 3.59 | | |
| Claude Lamy | EXG | 331 | 0.73 | | |
| Catherine Evesque | DIV | 274 | 0.61 | | |
| Burhan Caglar | DIV | 140 | 0.31 | | |
| Votes | | 45,069 | 100.00 | 37,872 | 100.00 |
| Valid votes | | 45,069 | 97.99 | 37,872 | 91.74 |
| Blank votes | | 678 | 1.47 | 2,458 | 5.95 |
| Null votes | | 246 | 0.53 | 953 | 2.31 |
| Turnout | | 45,993 | 55.95 | 41,283 | 50.23 |
| Abstentions | | 36,204 | 44.05 | 40,900 | 49.77 |
| Registered voters | | 82,197 | | 82,183 | |
Source: Ministry of the Interior

=== 2012 ===
2012 legislative election in Loir-Et-Cher's 3rd constituency
| Candidate | Party | First round | | Second round | |
| Candidate | Party | Votes | % | Votes | % |
|---|---|---|---|---|---|
| Maurice Leroy | NC | 22,458 | 43.42% | 28,847 | 58.05% |
| Karine Gloanec Maurin | PS | 15,331 | 29.64% | 20,850 | 41.95% |
| Jean-Yves Narquin | FN | 6,766 | 13.08% | | |
| Patrick Callu | FG | 3,042 | 5.88% | | |
| Florent Grospart | EELV | 1,229 | 2.38% | | |
| Patrick Rougevin-Baville | PCD | 723 | 1.40% | | |
| Jeanne Dumont | UDN | 623 | 1.20% | | |
| Mariève Lambert | DLR | 464 | 0.90% | | |
| Claude Lamy | LO | 284 | 0.55% | | |
| Eric Labbe | | 279 | 0.54% | | |
| Gérard Confino | AEI | 270 | 0.52% | | |
| Alex Babarczi | NPA | 218 | 0.42% | | |
| Alain Alexandre | AR | 30 | 0.06% | | |
| Valid votes | | 51,717 | 98.29% | 49,697 | 96.97% |
| Spoilt and null votes | | 901 | 1.71% | 1,555 | 3.03% |
| Votes cast / turnout | | 52,618 | 63.85% | 51,252 | 62.20% |
| Abstentions | | 29,786 | 36.15% | 31,146 | 37.80% |
| Registered voters | | 82,404 | 100.00% | 82,398 | 100.00% |

=== 2007 ===
Legislative Election 2007: Loir-et-Cher's 3rd constituency
| Party | Candidate | Votes | % | ±% |
|---|---|---|---|---|
| NM | Maurice Leroy | 16,312 | 36.54 | N/A |
| PS | Marie-Hélène Vidal | 9,816 | 21.99 | +1.49 |
| DVD | Jean-Yves Narquin | 8,420 | 18.86 | N/A |
| FN | Jeanne Dumont | 2,439 | 5.46 | −5.42 |
| PCF | Patrick Callu | 2,240 | 5.02 | −0.49 |
| LV | Florent Grospart | 1,746 | 3.91 | +0.49 |
| LCR | Fabien Poidevin | 1,059 | 2.37 | +0.18 |
| Others | N/A | 2,607 | 5.85 | −1.06 |
| Turnout | | 45,793 | 64.63 | −3.10 |
| Registered electors | | 70,851 | | |
2nd round result
| NM | Maurice Leroy | 24,707 | 58.29 | N/A |
| PS | Marie-Hélène Vidal | 17,676 | 41.71 | N/A |
| Turnout | | 44,425 | 62.70 | N/A |
| Registered electors | | 70,851 | | |
| NM gain from UDF | | | | |

=== 2002 ===
Legislative Election 2002: Loir-et-Cher's 3rd constituency
| Party | Candidate | Votes | % | ±% |
|---|---|---|---|---|
| UDF | Maurice Leroy | 23,162 | 50.59 | +15.02 |
| PS | Béatrice Arruga-Boisseuil | 9,386 | 20.50 | −5.63 |
| FN | Hélène Mazur | 4,983 | 10.88 | −4.54 |
| PCF | Patrick Callu | 2,524 | 5.51 | −3.90 |
| LV | Dominique Hermelin | 1,565 | 3.42 | −0.24 |
| LCR | Fabien Poidevin | 1,004 | 2.19 | N/A |
| Others | N/A | 3,160 | 6.91 | N/A |
| Turnout | | 46,986 | 67.73 | −4.09 |
| Registered electors | | 69,373 | | |
| UDF hold | | | | |

=== 1997 ===
Legislative Election 1997: Loir-et-Cher's 3rd constituency
| Party | Candidate | Votes | % | ±% |
|---|---|---|---|---|
| FD (UDF) | Maurice Leroy | 16,189 | 35.57 | +2.17 |
| PS | Daniel Chanet | 11,894 | 26.13 | +5.60 |
| FN | Aymar de Boisgrollier | 7,016 | 15.42 | +3.87 |
| PCF | Patrick Callu | 4,281 | 9.41 | +1.72 |
| LDI | Madeleine Colin-Motheron | 2,626 | 5.77 | N/A |
| LV | Dominique Joubert | 1,665 | 3.66 | N/A |
| GE | Patrick Hardouin | 1,046 | 2.30 | −3.96 |
| MEI | Laurence Rateau | 796 | 1.75 | N/A |
| Turnout | | 48,564 | 71.82 | −1.64 |
| Registered electors | | 67,620 | | |
2nd round result
| FD (UDF) | Maurice Leroy | 26,092 | 55.38 | -4.33 |
| PS | Daniel Chanet | 21,024 | 44.62 | +4.33 |
| Turnout | | 50,644 | 74.90 | +2.74 |
| Registered electors | | 67,620 | | |
| FD hold | | | | |

=== 1993 ===
Legislative Election 1993: Loir-et-Cher's 3rd constituency
| Party | Candidate | Votes | % | ±% |
|---|---|---|---|---|
| UDF | Jean Desanlis | 15,680 | 33.40 | |
| PS | Daniel Chanet | 6,939 | 20.53 | |
| DVD | Hubert d'Alancon | 8,167 | 17.40 | |
| FN | Aymar de Boisgrollier | 5,422 | 11.55 | |
| PCF | Jean-Jacques Mansart | 3,609 | 7.69 | |
| GE | Josiane Simon | 2,941 | 6.26 | |
| NERNA | Andree Chretien | 1,490 | 3.17 | |
| Turnout | | 49,995 | 73.46 | |
| Registered electors | | 68,055 | | |
2nd round result
| UDF | Jean Desanlis | 26,804 | 59.71 | |
| PS | Daniel Chanet | 18,086 | 40.29 | |
| Turnout | | 49,099 | 72.16 | |
| Registered electors | | 68,046 | | |
| UDF hold | | | | |
