= Nicolas Perruchot =

French politician

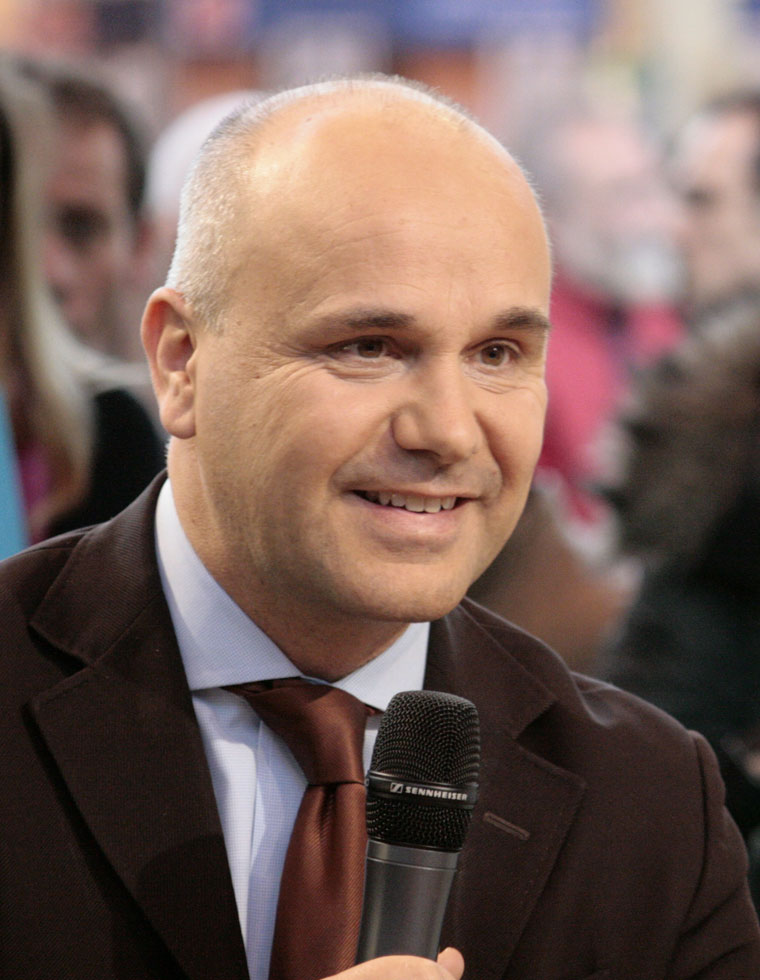
- Known for: Being a member of the National Assembly of France

Nicolas Perruchot (born July 9, 1966) is a member of the National Assembly of France. He represents the Loir-et-Cher department, and is a member of the New Centre.

== Biography ==
He is named in the Pandora Papers.

He began by working as a consultant in business at France Telecom and then in the business of his stepfather. He joined the RPR and then joined the Union for French Democracy. He won his first mandate at 34 when he was elected general councilor in 2000 (canton of Blois-3) with 3 votes in advance, during a by-election. A year later, during the municipal elections he defeated the outgoing mayor Jack Lang with 37 votes in advance. This victory on the wire against an adversary very known at the national level earned him media notoriety, the press nicknamed him "the knocker of Jack Lang". The following year, in June 2002, he was elected deputy of the first district Loir-et-Cher with 600 votes ahead.
