= Montloué =

- Commune
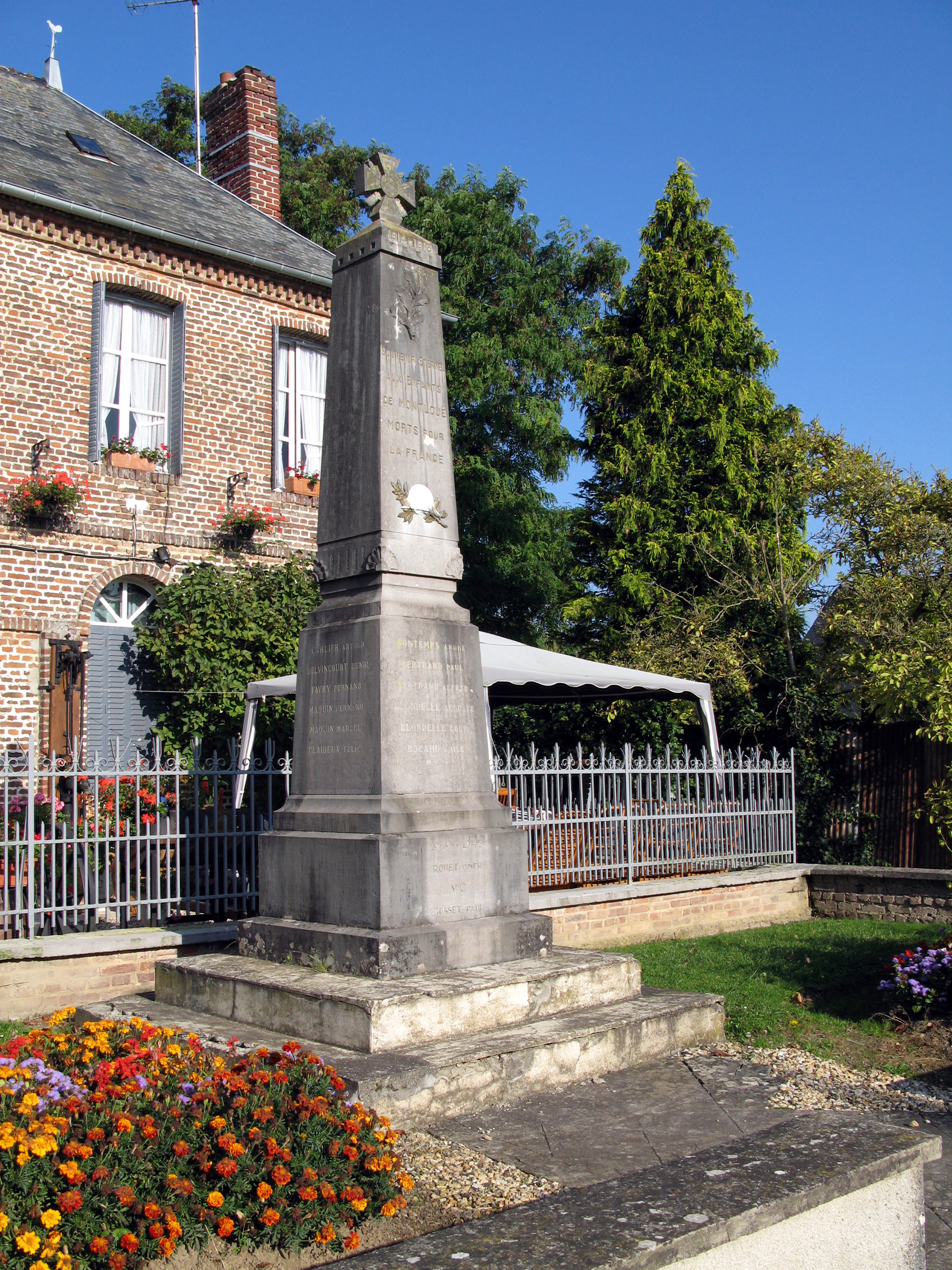
- War memorial
- Location of Montloué
- Location within France Location within Hauts-de-France
- Coordinates: 49°40′30″N 4°04′14″E
- Country: France
- Region: Hauts-de-France
- Department: Aisne
- Arrondissement: Vervins
- Canton: Vervins
- Intercommunality: Portes de la Thiérache

Government
  - Mayor (2026–32): Véronique Tramut
- Area^{1}: 15.58 km^{2} (6.02 sq mi)
- Elevation: 130 m (430 ft)
- Highest elevation: 196 m (643 ft)
- Lowest elevation: 115 m (377 ft)
- Population (2023): 193
  - Density: 12.4/km^{2} (32.1/sq mi)
- Time zone: UTC+01:00 (CET)
  - Summer (DST): UTC+02:00 (CEST)
- INSEE/Postal code: 02519 /02340
- ^{1} French Land Register data, which excludes lakes, ponds, glaciers > 1 km^{2} (0.386 sq mi or 247 acres) and river estuaries.

Montloué (French pronunciation: [mɔ̃lwe]) is a commune in the Aisne department in Hauts-de-France in northern France.

== Population ==
Historical population
Year	Pop.	±% p.a.
1968	273	—
1975	233	−2.24%
1982	185	−3.24%
1990	196	+0.72%
1999	189	−0.40%
2007	165	−1.68%
2012	166	+0.12%
2017	187	+2.41%
2023	193	+0.53%
Source: INSEE

== See also ==
- Communes of the Aisne department
