= Marc Fesneau =

French politician (born 1971)

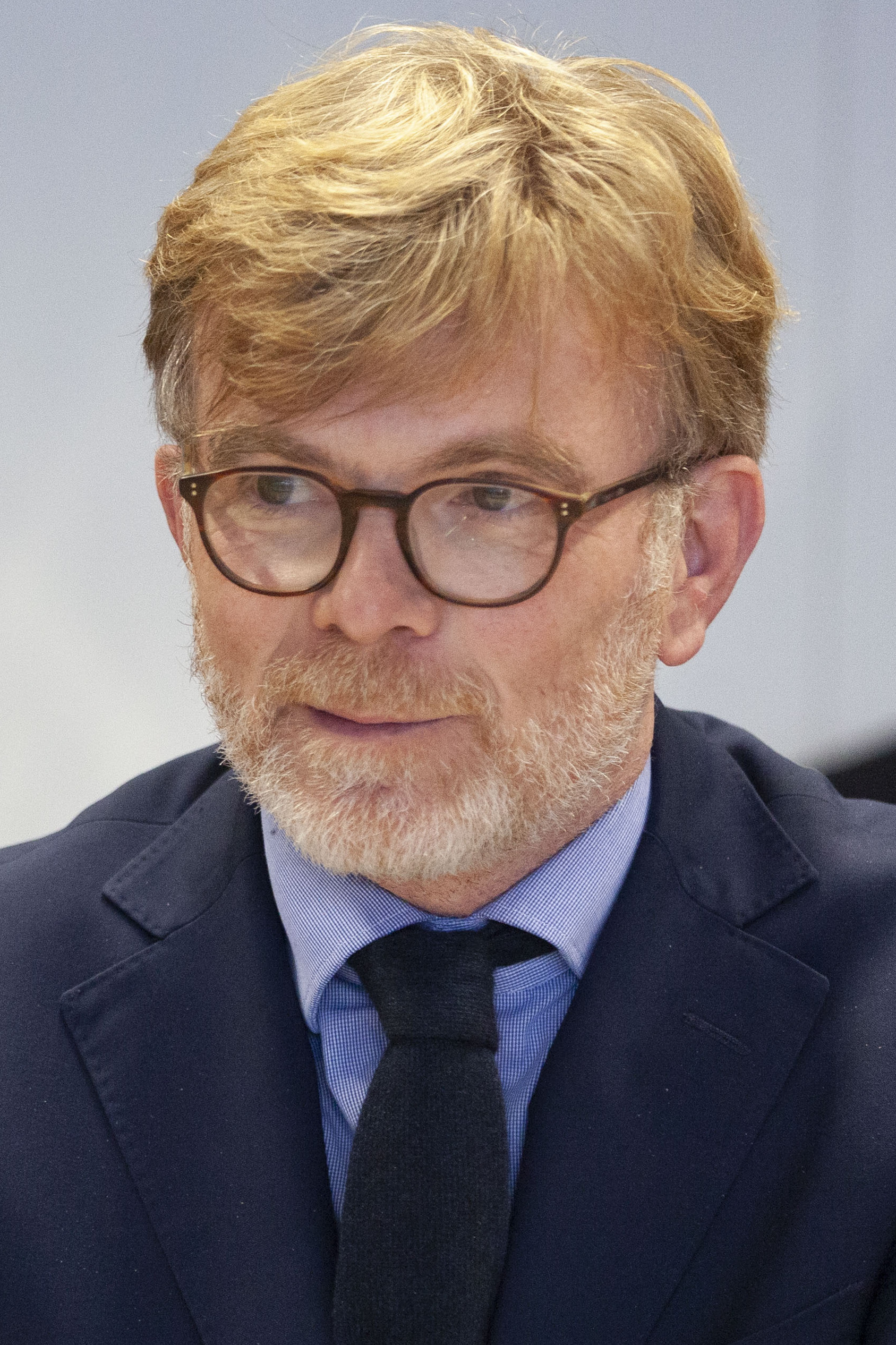
- Fesneau in 2024

President of The Democrats group in the National Assembly
- Incumbent
- Assumed office 18 July 2024
- Preceded by: Jean-Paul Matteï
- In office 27 June 2017 – 17 October 2018
- Preceded by: Position established
- Succeeded by: Patrick Mignola

Minister of Agriculture and Food Sovereignty
- In office 20 May 2022 – 21 September 2024
- Prime Minister: Élisabeth Borne; Gabriel Attal
- Preceded by: Julien Denormandie
- Succeeded by: Annie Genevard

Minister Delegate for Relations with Parliament and Citizen Participation
- In office 16 October 2018 – 20 May 2022
- Prime Minister: Édouard Philippe; Jean Castex
- Preceded by: Christophe Castaner
- Succeeded by: Olivier Véran

Member of the National Assembly for Loir-et-Cher's 1st constituency
- Incumbent
- Assumed office 8 July 2024
- Preceded by: Mathilde Desjonquères
- In office 22 June 2022 – 22 July 2022
- Preceded by: Stéphane Baudu
- Succeeded by: Mathilde Desjonquères
- In office 21 June 2017 – 16 November 2018
- Preceded by: Denys Robillard
- Succeeded by: Stéphane Baudu

Mayor of Marchenoir
- In office 21 March 2008 – 1 August 2017
- Preceded by: Gérard Martineau
- Succeeded by: Sylvie Gagnier

Personal details
- Born: 11 January 1971 (age 55) Paris, France
- Party: Democratic Movement (2007–present)
- Other political affiliations: Union for French Democracy (1997–2007)
- Education: Sciences Po

Marc Fesneau (French pronunciation: [maʁk feno]; born 11 January 1971) is a French politician of the Democratic Movement (MoDem) who has represented the 1st constituency of the Loir-et-Cher department and presided over the Democrats group in the National Assembly since the 2024 legislative election. He previously served as a deputy from 2017 to 2018 and briefly in 2022, and presided the MoDem parliamentary group from 2017 to 2018.

Fesnau served as Minister of Agriculture and Food in the governments of Prime Ministers Élisabeth Borne and Gabriel Attal between May 2022 and September 2024. He also served as Minister for Relations with Parliament under Prime Minister Édouard Philippe from 2018 until 2020, when his portfolio was expanded in the subsequent government of Jean Castex to include citizen participation.

== Political career ==
=== Early career ===
First elected to the municipal council of Marchenoir, Loir-et-Cher in 1995, Fesneau assumed the mayorship in 2008. He served as a regional councillor in Centre from 2004 to 2010. In 2009, he was selected to be the Democratic Movement's candidate in Centre for the 2010 regional election, in which the list he led placed sixth. He failed to be reelected regional councillor.

In 2010, Fesneau was appointed secretary-general of the Democratic Movement. François Bayrou included Fesneau in his shadow cabinet; in this capacity, he served as opposition counterpart to Minister of Agriculture Bruno Le Maire. In 2017, Fesneau became party vice president.

=== Member of the National Assembly, 2017–2018 ===
In the 2017 legislative election, Fesneau was elected to the National Assembly. He was subsequently unanimously elected to the presidency of the MoDem group in the National Assembly on 25 June; though Marielle de Sarnez had initially announced her intent to run, she ultimately decided not to. He also served as member of the Committee on National Defence and Armed Forces (2017–2018) and the Committee on Legal Affairs (2018). In this capacity, he was his parliamentary group's rapporteur on constitutional reforms.

In September 2018, following François de Rugy's appointment to the government, Fesneau ran for the presidency of the National Assembly. He placed third behind Annie Genevard of The Republicans and Richard Ferrand of La République En Marche!, who was elected with 254 votes.

=== Career in government, 2018–present ===
In October 2018, Fesneau was appointed Minister for Relations with Parliament in the government of Prime Minister Édouard Philippe under the direct leadership of Philippe. He was replaced by his substitute Stéphane Baudu in the National Assembly. Upon the inauguration of the government of Jean Castex in July 2020, the citizen participation portfolio was added to his title, which was changed to minister delegate.

In the 2021 regional election in Centre-Val de Loire (Centre until 2015), Fesneau led the MoDem list supported by La République En Marche! and Agir, which placed fifth. He regained a seat in the regional council, where he took the presidency of the MoDem group.

In May 2022, Fesneau succeeded Julien Denormandie as Minister of Agriculture and Food under Prime Minister Élisabeth Borne. In June 2022, he ran for reelection to his seat in Loir-et-Cher and won.

Under Fesneau’s leadership, France became the first member of the European Union to launch a tender for 80 million doses of bird flu vaccines in 2023; the previous year, France had been the worst affected European Union country and had to cull more than 20 million birds.

In October 2023, Fesneau participated in the first joint cabinet retreat of the German and French governments in Hamburg, chaired by Chancellor Olaf Scholz and President Emmanuel Macron.
