= Loir-et-Cher =

Department in Centre-Val de Loire, France

- Department of France
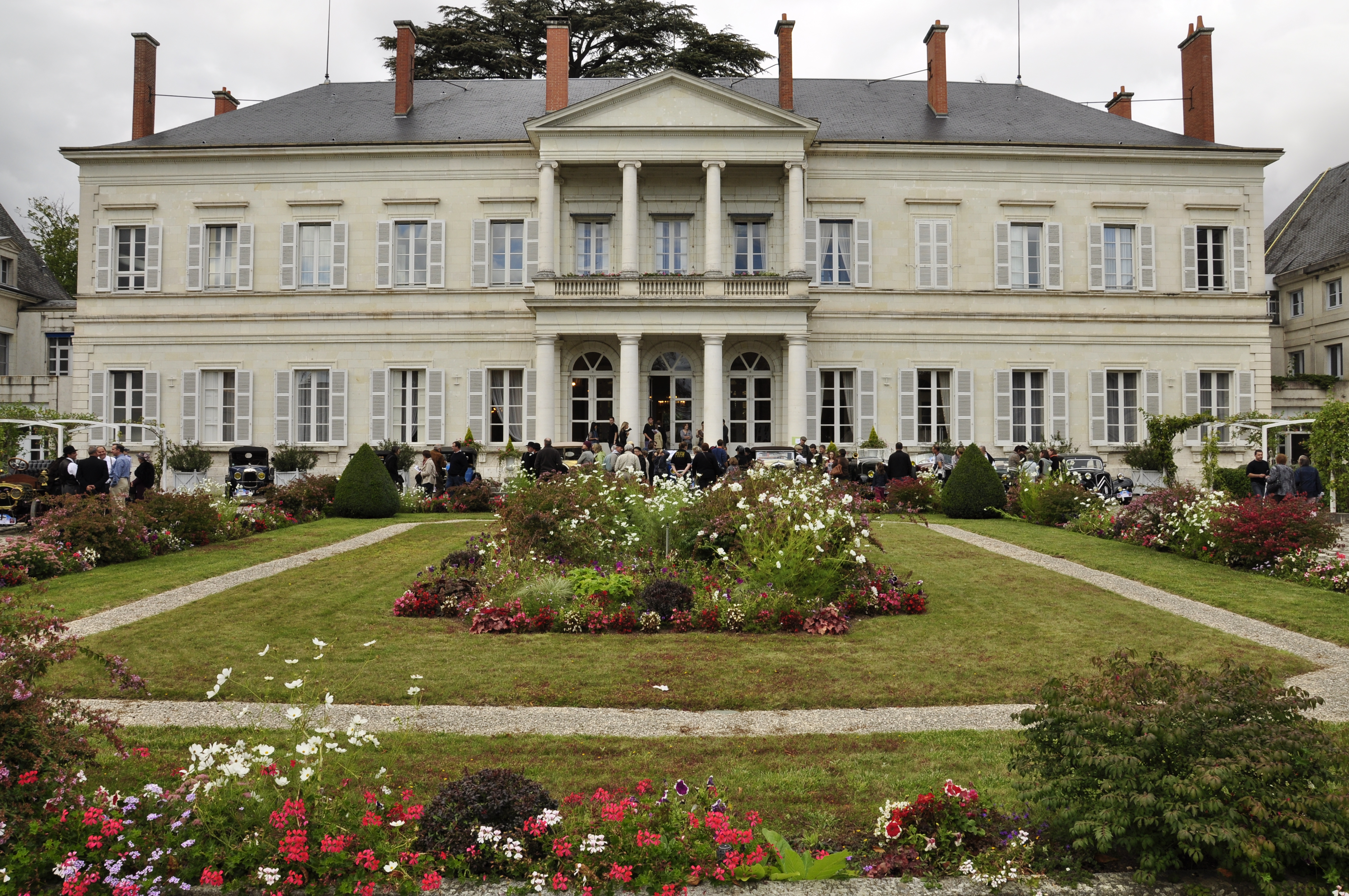
- Prefecture building of the Loir-et-Cher department, in Blois

- Flag Coat of arms

- Location of Loir-et-Cher in France
- Coordinates: 47°16′N 00°40′E
- Country: France
- Region: Centre-Val de Loire
- Prefecture: Blois
- Subprefectures: Romorantin-Lanthenay; Vendôme

Government
  - President of the Departmental Council: Philippe Gouet (UDI)

Area^{1}
  - Total: 6,314 km^{2} (2,438 sq mi)

Population (2023)
  - Total: 328,543
  - Rank: 72nd
  - Density: 52.03/km^{2} (134.8/sq mi)
- Time zone: UTC+1 (CET)
  - Summer (DST): UTC+2 (CEST)
- Department number: 41
- Arrondissements: 3
- Cantons: 15
- Communes: 267
- ^1 French Land Register data, which exclude estuaries and lakes, ponds and glaciers larger than 1 km^{2}

Loir-et-Cher (/ˌlwɑːr eɪ ˈʃɛər/; French: [lwaʁ e ʃɛʁ]; lit. 'Loir and Cher') is a department in the Centre-Val de Loire region of France. It is named after two rivers which run through it, the Loir in its northern part and the Cher in its southern part. Its prefecture is Blois. The INSEE and La Poste gave it the number 41. It had a population of 328,543 in 2023.

== History ==
The department of Loir-et-Cher covers a territory which had a substantial population during the prehistoric period. However it was not until the Middle Ages that local inhabitants built various castles and other fortifications to enable them to withstand a series of invasions of Normans, Burgundians, the English and others.

The economy is quite flourishing: there are shops in the valley, and agriculture is prominent in the region of the Beauce and the Perche to the Sologne which were prosperous until the 17th century. However, politically, the region remained quartered between the neighboring earldoms and duchies. In 1397, the House of Orleans became the possession of the Comté of Blois. In 1497, Louis d’Orleans (23rd hereditary Count of Blois) was crowned Louis XII. This marked the beginning of the importance of Blois and of the Blaisois in the political life of the French, especially under the last Valois. During that period, kings and financiers competed to build castles and elegant abodes which now form an important part of the French national heritage. (Chambord, Blois, Cheverny and so on.)

This was followed by a period of extremely violent religious wars during Charles IX's reign. In 1576 and 1588, the General Estates convened in Blois. L’Orléanais, le Berry, la Touraine, le Perche et le Maine occupied le Loir-et-Cher and its provinces in 1790. The Loir-et-Cher's birth as a department was very difficult and laborious. On 29 September 1789, the constitution's advisory board made a report in which it wanted to attribute one of the 80 departments to Blois. However, some cities and canton capitals, such as Tours and Orleans, disagreed. Within the department, Montrichard turned to Amboise and Tours, Saint-Aignan wanted to turn to the Berry, and Salbris to Vierzon.

Finally, Orleans gave Blois an important part of the Sologne except Beaugency and Tours didn't give Amboise. The department was founded 4 March 1790, in accordance with the law of 22 December 1789. It is constituted of some old provinces of the Orleanais and of the Touraine along with a part of the Berry (the left bank of the Selles en Berry's Cher which became Selles sur Cher, to Saint-Aignan). It is mostly due to these tribulations that the department is narrow in the centre, yet reaches its widest extent beyond the Loir on the North and the Cher on the South. After the coalition victory at the battle of Waterloo (18 June 1815), the Prussian troops occupied the department from June 1815 to November 1818.

The poet Pierre de Ronsard, the inventor Denis Papin, and the historian Augustin Thierry come from here. Other well-known people are also associated with this department, such as François the First, Gaston d’Orléans, the Marshall Maunoury, and the abbot Gregoire (Bishop of Blois, elected at the Constituante). In the artistic domain, there is the compositor Antoine Boësset (1587–1643), musician in the Louis XII de France's court, who was the head of the Music of the King's Bedroom from 1623 to 1643.

The Loir-et-Cher's department is a part of the Centre-Val de Loire Region. It is adjacent of these departments : the Eure-et-Loir, the Loiret, the Cher, the Indre, the Indre-et-Loire and the Sarthe. Due to its surface area of 6 343 km^{2}, it is the 31st largest department in the nation. It has a privileged geographical situation because it is in the center of the Centre region and near the Paris basin. An axe lively and dynamic, brings Blois closer (the department's administrative center) to both the urban conglomerations near it: Orleans and Tours. Located on the boundaries of the Perche, the Beauce, the Sologne and the Touraine, it finds its territorial identity in the diversity of its geography and its landscapes. Cut in its middle by the Loire, it shows an image of balance and diversity.

== Geography ==
Loir-et-Cher is a part of the modern region of Centre-Val de Loire. Adjacent departments are Eure-et-Loir to the north, Loiret to the north-east, Cher to the south-east, Indre to the south, Indre-et-Loire to the south-west, and Sarthe to the west.

The department comprises 6,314 km^{2}, which makes it the 31st largest of the French departments in terms of area. The line of the river Loire traverses the land, ensuring easy communication between its own capital, Blois, and the vibrant cultural and commercial centres of Tours to the west and the fringes of the Seine-Paris basin at Orléans to the east.

Its main rivers are the Loire, on which its prefecture (capital) Blois is situated, the Loir and the Cher.

=== Principal towns ===
The most populous commune is Blois, the prefecture. As of 2023, there are 6 communes with more than 5,000 inhabitants:

| Commune | Population (2023) |
|---|---|
| Blois | 47,219 |
| Romorantin-Lanthenay | 18,373 |
| Vendôme | 15,758 |
| Vineuil | 8,064 |
| Le Controis-en-Sologne | 6,860 |
| Mer | 6,250 |

== Demographics ==
The inhabitants of the department are called the Loir-et-Chériens in French.

Historical population

| Year | Pop. | ±% p.a. |
|---|---|---|
| 1801 | 209,957 | — |
| 1806 | 218,740 | +0.82% |
| 1821 | 227,527 | +0.26% |
| 1831 | 235,750 | +0.36% |
| 1841 | 249,462 | +0.57% |
| 1851 | 261,892 | +0.49% |
| 1861 | 269,029 | +0.27% |
| 1872 | 268,801 | −0.01% |
| 1881 | 275,713 | +0.28% |
| 1891 | 280,392 | +0.17% |
| 1901 | 275,538 | −0.17% |
| 1911 | 271,231 | −0.16% |
| 1921 | 251,528 | −0.75% |
| 1931 | 241,592 | −0.40% |

| Year | Pop. | ±% p.a. |
|---|---|---|
| 1936 | 240,908 | −0.06% |
| 1946 | 242,419 | +0.06% |
| 1954 | 239,824 | −0.13% |
| 1962 | 250,741 | +0.56% |
| 1968 | 267,900 | +1.11% |
| 1975 | 283,690 | +0.82% |
| 1982 | 296,224 | +0.62% |
| 1990 | 305,937 | +0.40% |
| 1999 | 314,968 | +0.32% |
| 2007 | 326,291 | +0.44% |
| 2012 | 331,656 | +0.33% |
| 2017 | 331,915 | +0.02% |
| 2023 | 328,543 | −0.17% |

== Politics ==
The president of the Departmental Council is Philippe Gouet (UDI), elected in July 2021.

=== Current National Assembly Representatives ===
| Constituency | Member | Party |
|---|---|---|
| Loir-et-Cher's 1st constituency | Marc Fesneau | MoDem |
| Loir-et-Cher's 2nd constituency | Roger Chudeau | National Rally |
| Loir-et-Cher's 3rd constituency | Christophe Marion | Renaissance |

See also the Results of the 2024 French legislative election.

== Tourism ==
=== Châteaux ===
Loir-et-Cher has an important number of historic châteaux, including the following:

- Château de Blois
- Château de Chaumont
- Château de Chambord
- Château de Cheverny
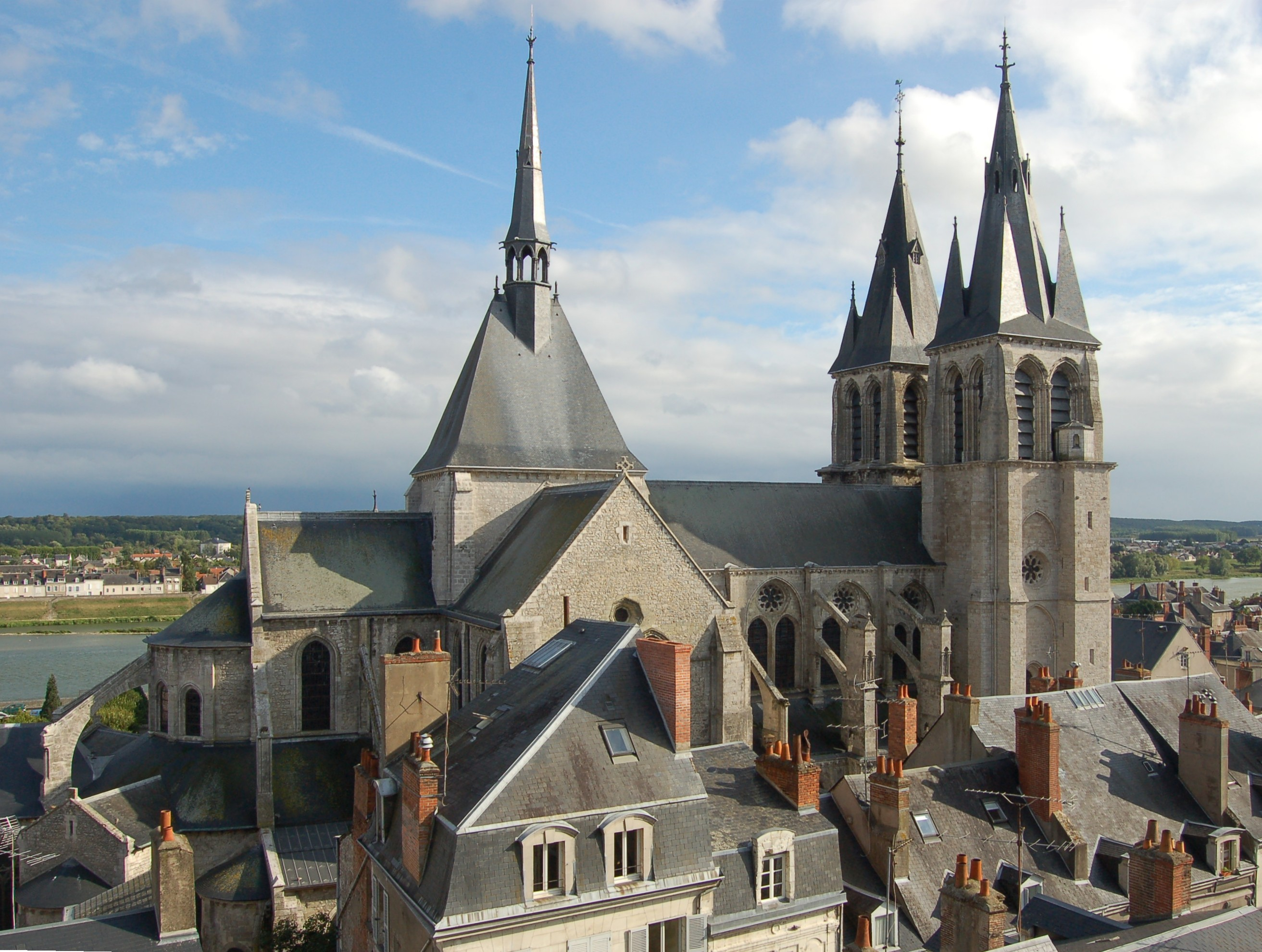
Blois

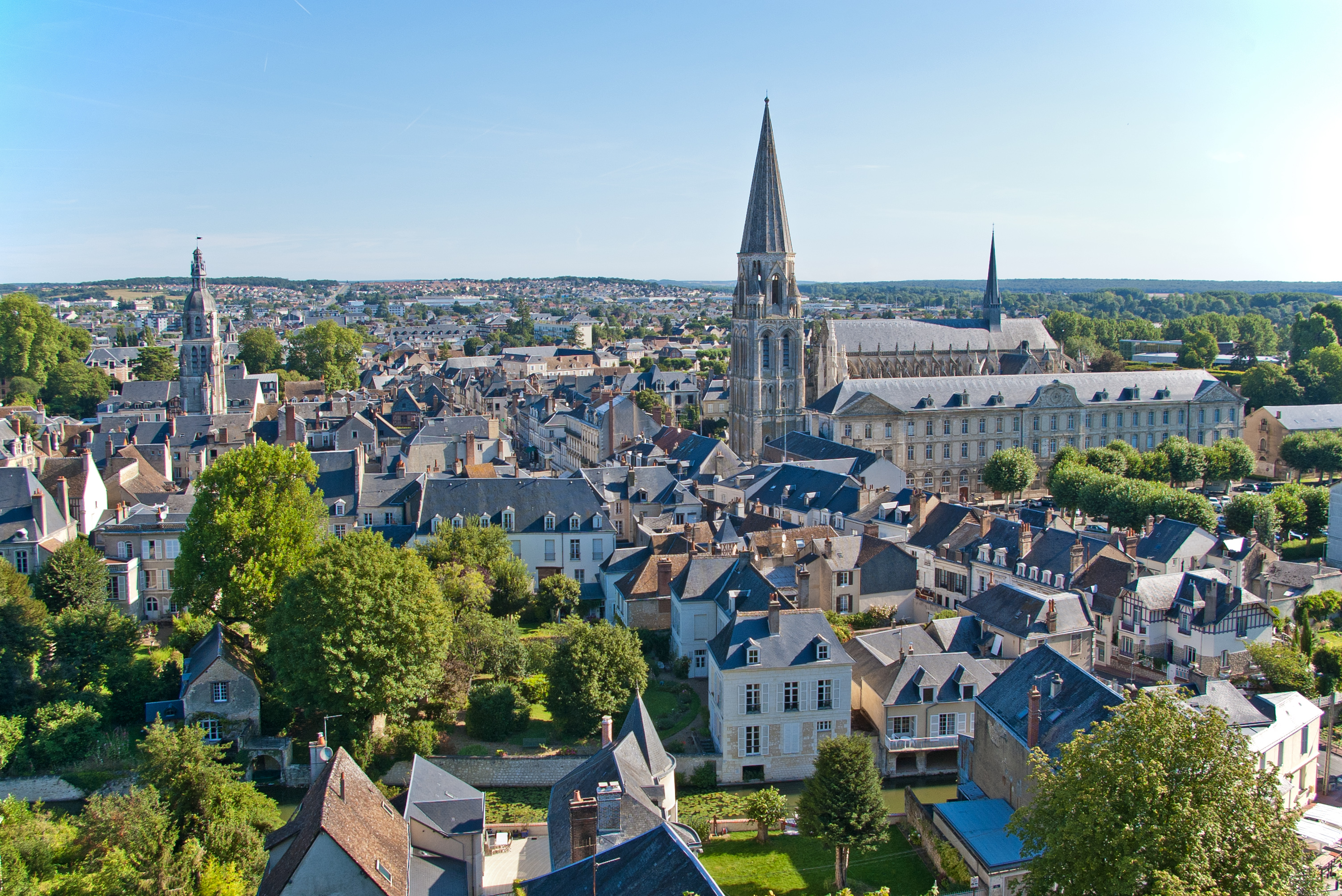
Vendôme

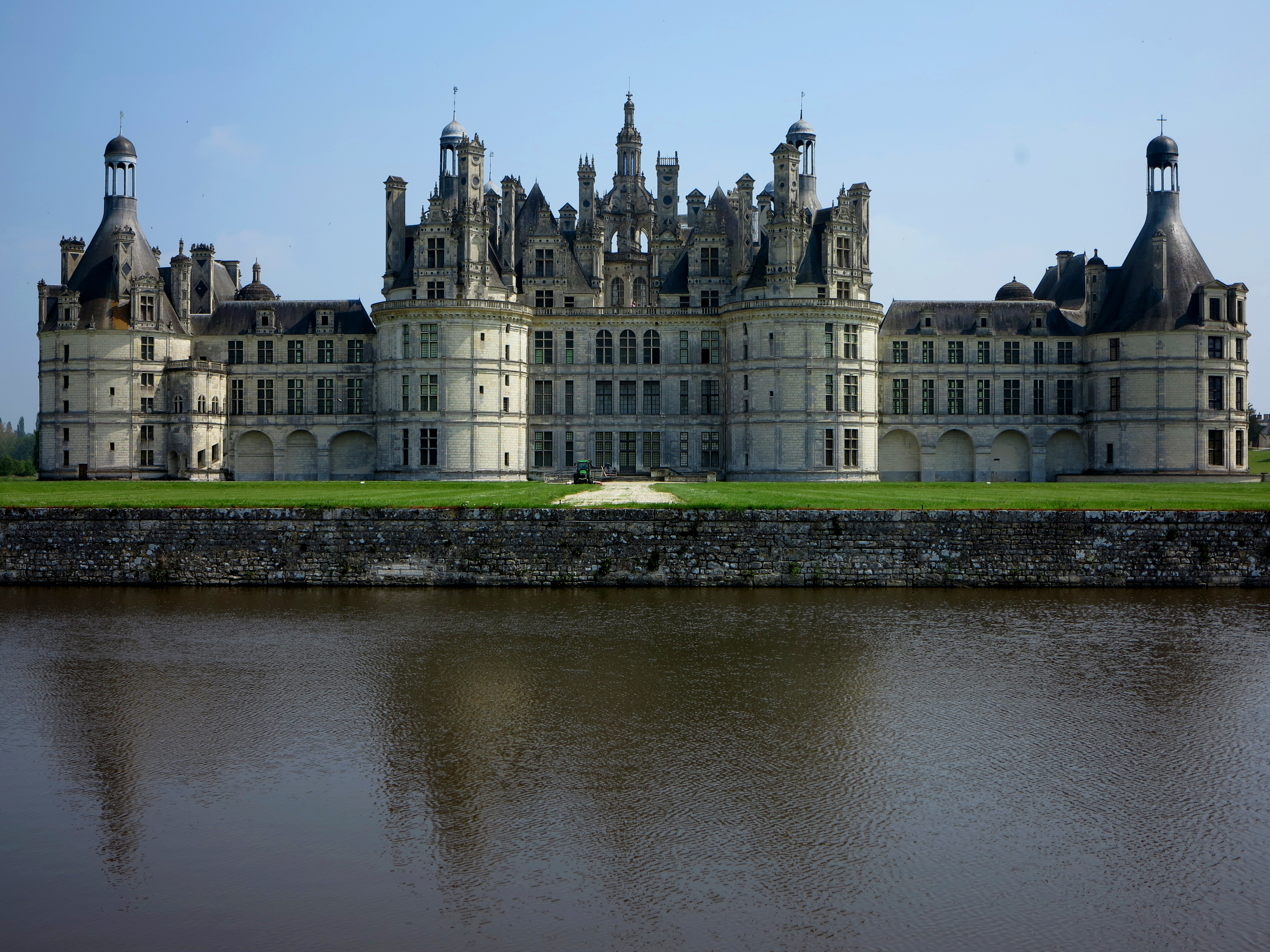
Château de Chambord

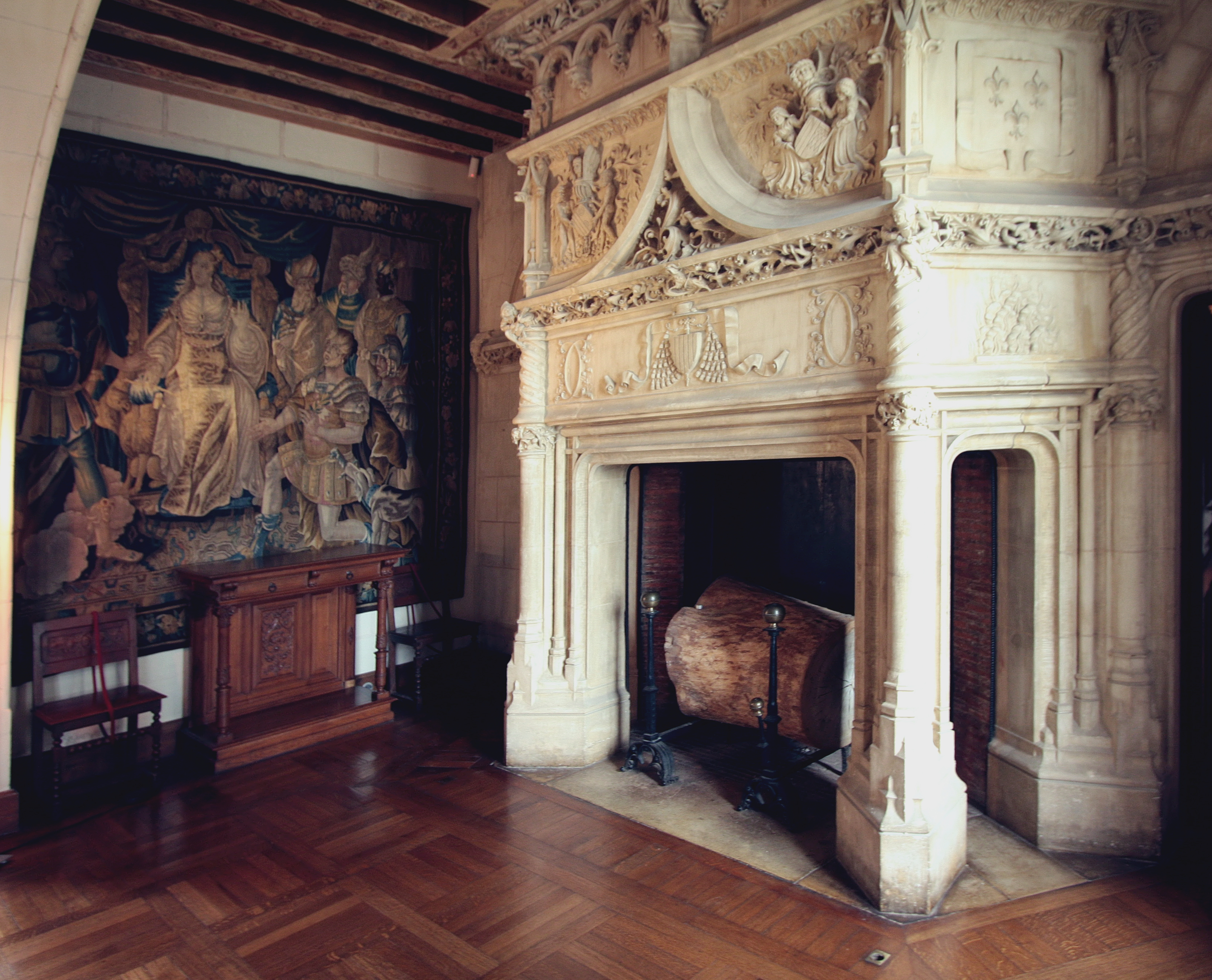
Interior of the Château de Chaumont

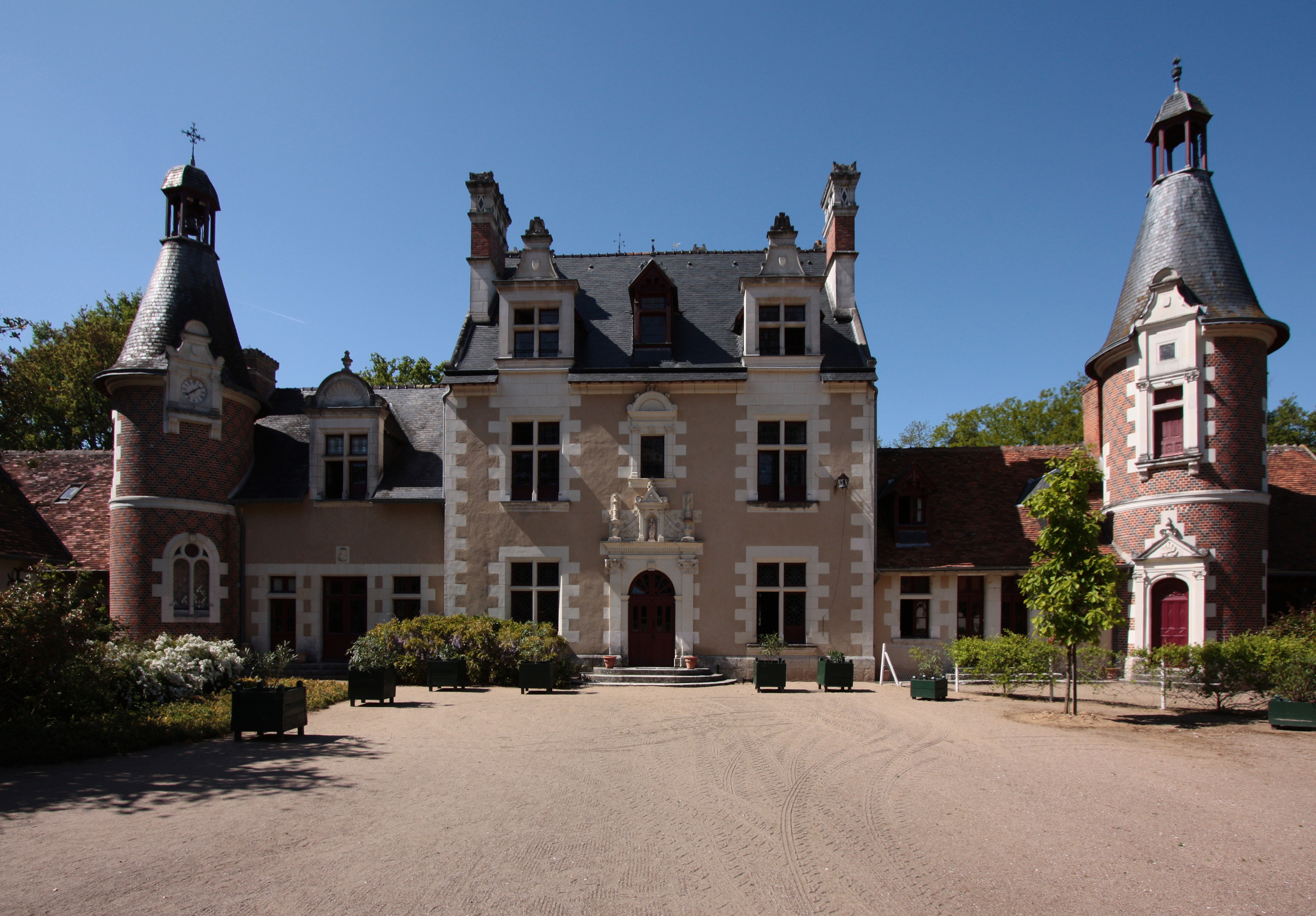
Château de Troussay

=== Filming location – Heart of Oak ===
Heart of Oak (Le Chêne), a 2022 French nature documentary directed by Laurent Charbonnier and Michel Seydoux, was filmed around a 210-year-old oak tree located in the Sologne region of Loir-et-Cher. The tree stands approximately 900 m from the home of co-director Laurent Charbonnier, offering filmmakers intimate access to its changing seasonal ecosystem.

== See also ==
- Cantons of the Loir-et-Cher department
- Communes of the Loir-et-Cher department
- Arrondissements of the Loir-et-Cher department
