= List of arrondissements of France =

As of 2019 France contains 332 arrondissements (including 12 overseas).

== Complete list ==
Dep.	Chief town	Arrondissement	Population (2016)	Area (km^{2})	Population density (people/km^{2})	Communes
01	Belley	Belley	120,594	1,584	76	105
01	Bourg-en-Bresse	Bourg-en-Bresse	331,400	2,874	115	199
01	Gex	Gex	93,027	405	230	27
01	Nantua	Nantua	93,404	900	104	62
02	Château-Thierry	Château-Thierry	69,836	1,115	63	108
02	Laon	Laon	157,371	2,175	72	240
02	Saint-Quentin	Saint-Quentin	128,958	1,071	120	126
02	Soissons	Soissons	107,744	1,342	80	166
02	Vervins	Vervins	72,157	1,658	44	160
03	Montluçon	Montluçon	108,364	2,117	51	89
03	Moulins	Moulins	106,124	2,958	36	109
03	Vichy	Vichy	124,896	2,266	55	119
04	Barcelonnette	Barcelonnette	7,874	1,028	8	14
04	Castellane	Castellane	11,403	1,718	7	41
04	Digne-les-Bains	Digne-les-Bains	47,298	1,574	30	46
04	Forcalquier	Forcalquier	95,990	2,605	37	97
05	Briançon	Briançon	35,266	2,138	16	36
05	Gap	Gap	105,841	3,411	31	126
06	Grasse	Grasse	561,067	1,231	456	62
06	Nice	Nice	522,637	3,067	170	101
07	Largentière	Largentière	101,490	2,646	38	151
07	Privas	Privas	84,907	1,146	74	66
07	Tournon-sur-Rhône	Tournon-sur-Rhône	138,760	1,737	80	118
08	Charleville-Mézières	Charleville-Mézières	158,005	1,825	87	157
08	Rethel	Rethel	37,384	1,200	31	101
08	Sedan	Sedan	58,136	792	73	73
08	Vouziers	Vouziers	21,846	1,412	15	118
09	Foix	Foix	47,572	1,819	26	115
09	Pamiers	Pamiers	64,938	1,052	62	91
09	Saint-Girons	Saint-Girons	40,557	2,019	20	121
10	Bar-sur-Aube	Bar-sur-Aube	28,759	1,240	23	108
10	Nogent-sur-Seine	Nogent-sur-Seine	54,067	1,224	44	79
10	Troyes	Troyes	226,084	3,540	64	244
11	Carcassonne	Carcassonne	159,539	2,310	69	186
11	Limoux	Limoux	42,546	1,727	25	138
11	Narbonne	Narbonne	165,940	2,102	79	109
12	Millau	Millau	79,346	3,742	21	110
12	Rodez	Rodez	111,180	2,870	39	79
12	Villefranche-de-Rouergue	Villefranche-de-Rouergue	88,171	2,124	42	96
13	Aix-en-Provence	Aix-en-Provence	450,153	1,658	272	48
13	Arles	Arles	171,684	2,032	85	29
13	Istres	Istres	327,971	715	459	21
13	Marseille	Marseille	1,069,909	683	1,566	21
14	Bayeux	Bayeux	73,896	977	76	123
14	Caen	Caen	384,540	1,596	241	201
14	Lisieux	Lisieux	162,678	1,756	93	160
14	Vire-Normandie	Vire	72,565	1,206	60	44
15	Aurillac	Aurillac	82,391	1,937	43	93
15	Mauriac	Mauriac	25,881	1,278	20	55
15	Saint-Flour	Saint-Flour	37,697	2,511	15	98
16	Angoulême	Angoulême	181,456	1,868	97	115
16	Cognac	Cognac	99,987	1,671	60	110
16	Confolens	Confolens	71,845	2,418	30	141
17	Jonzac	Jonzac	67,989	1,740	39	129
17	Rochefort	Rochefort	189,875	1,535	124	78
17	La Rochelle	La Rochelle	215,707	853	253	58
17	Saintes	Saintes	116,057	1,320	88	88
17	Saint-Jean-d'Angély	Saint-Jean-d'Angély	52,563	1,416	37	110
18	Bourges	Bourges	173,037	2,784	62	128
18	Saint-Amand-Montrond	Saint-Amand-Montrond	63,938	2,684	24	116
18	Vierzon	Vierzon	70,135	1,767	40	43
19	Brive-la-Gaillarde	Brive-la-Gaillarde	128,863	1,471	88	96
19	Tulle	Tulle	70,741	2,364	30	104
19	Ussel	Ussel	41,931	2,022	21	80
2A	Ajaccio	Ajaccio	113,473	2,224	51	81
2A	Sartène	Sartène	40,830	1,790	23	43
2B	Bastia	Bastia	87,776	474	185	27
2B	Calvi	Calvi	29,576	1,338	22	51
2B	Corte	Corte	58,800	2,853	21	158
21	Beaune	Beaune	111,295	2,359	47	222
21	Dijon	Dijon	361,844	2,808	129	224
21	Montbard	Montbard	60,074	3,596	17	252
22	Dinan	Dinan	102,698	985	104	67
22	Guingamp	Guingamp	125,567	2,292	55	111
22	Lannion	Lannion	99,903	904	110	57
22	Saint-Brieuc	Saint-Brieuc	270,785	2,696	100	113
23	Aubusson	Aubusson	44,680	2,829	16	129
23	Guéret	Guéret	74,822	2,737	27	127
24	Bergerac	Bergerac	102,859	1,820	57	130
24	Nontron	Nontron	54,758	2,098	26	94
24	Périgueux	Périgueux	175,309	2,869	61	143
24	Sarlat-la-Canéda	Sarlat-la-Canéda	81,863	2,273	36	138
25	Besançon	Besançon	249,211	1,926	129	256
25	Montbéliard	Montbéliard	176,425	1,256	140	168
25	Pontarlier	Pontarlier	112,913	2,051	55	149
26	Die	Die	67,156	2,536	26	113
26	Nyons	Nyons	148,049	2,478	60	149
26	Valence	Valence	292,801	1,516	193	102
27	Les Andelys	Les Andelys	235,732	1,854	127	185
27	Bernay	Bernay	227,054	3,227	70	297
27	Évreux	Évreux	140,039	959	146	103
28	Chartres	Chartres	209,218	2,130	98	148
28	Châteaudun	Châteaudun	59,262	1,439	41	61
28	Dreux	Dreux	129,414	1,501	86	108
28	Nogent-le-Rotrou	Nogent-le-Rotrou	36,035	811	44	48
29	Brest	Brest	374,276	1,396	268	77
29	Châteaulin	Châteaulin	82,403	1,757	47	57
29	Morlaix	Morlaix	128,830	1,331	97	59
29	Quimper	Quimper	322,740	2,250	143	84
30	Alès	Alès	148,139	1,304	114	97
30	Nîmes	Nîmes	554,624	3,158	176	180
30	Le Vigan	Le Vigan	39,243	1,391	28	74
31	Muret	Muret	220,791	1,631	135	126
31	Saint-Gaudens	Saint-Gaudens	77,444	2,140	36	235
31	Toulouse	Toulouse	1,049,948	2,539	414	225
32	Auch	Auch	81,242	1,924	42	134
32	Condom	Condom	67,137	2,462	27	162
32	Mirande	Mirande	42,285	1,871	23	165
33	Arcachon	Arcachon	150,979	1,470	103	17
33	Blaye	Blaye	90,090	782	115	62
33	Bordeaux	Bordeaux	950,099	1,522	624	82
33	Langon	Langon	132,346	2,644	50	196
33	Lesparre-Médoc	Lesparre-Médoc	89,098	2,274	39	49
33	Libourne	Libourne	154,067	1,283	120	129
34	Béziers	Béziers	309,800	3,091	100	153
34	Lodève	Lodève	138,746	2,005	69	122
34	Montpellier	Montpellier	683,935	1,005	681	67
35	Fougères	Fougères-Vitré	184,039	2,173	85	106
35	Redon	Redon	102,157	1,303	78	50
35	Rennes	Rennes	599,717	2,228	269	109
35	Saint-Malo	Saint-Malo	165,866	1,071	155	68
36	Le Blanc	Le Blanc	31,714	1,782	18	57
36	Châteauroux	Châteauroux	129,106	2,622	49	84
36	La Châtre	La Châtre	28,433	1,204	24	51
36	Issoudun	Issoudun	34,252	1,182	29	49
37	Chinon	Chinon	103,824	2,297	45	106
37	Loches	Loches	118,282	2,743	43	112
37	Tours	Tours	384,117	1,088	353	54
38	Grenoble	Grenoble	738,149	4,399	168	263
38	La Tour-du-Pin	La Tour-du-Pin	302,380	1,543	196	136
38	Vienne	Vienne	212,383	1,490	143	113
39	Dole	Dole	106,246	1,770	60	190
39	Lons-le-Saunier	Lons-le-Saunier	104,522	2,272	46	249
39	Saint-Claude	Saint-Claude	49,749	958	52	55
40	Dax	Dax	224,716	3,194	70	152
40	Mont-de-Marsan	Mont-de-Marsan	180,294	6,048	30	175
41	Blois	Blois	150,805	1,950	77	93
41	Romorantin-Lanthenay	Romorantin-Lanthenay	112,145	2,671	42	74
41	Vendôme	Vendôme	69,819	1,722	41	100
42	Montbrison	Montbrison	181,551	1,943	93	135
42	Roanne	Roanne	157,160	1,780	88	113
42	Saint-Étienne	Saint-Étienne	423,286	1,058	400	75
43	Brioude	Brioude	45,768	1,887	24	111
43	Le Puy-en-Velay	Le Puy-en-Velay	96,498	1,931	50	102
43	Yssingeaux	Yssingeaux	85,073	1,160	73	44
44	Châteaubriant	Châteaubriant-Ancenis	222,436	3,158	70	76
44	Nantes	Nantes	830,509	1,959	424	76
44	Saint-Nazaire	Saint-Nazaire	327,907	1,758	187	55
45	Montargis	Montargis	170,285	2,657	64	125
45	Orléans	Orléans	440,562	2,925	151	121
45	Pithiviers	Pithiviers	63,483	1,193	53	79
46	Cahors	Cahors	71,943	1,861	39	98
46	Figeac	Figeac	54,566	1,593	34	118
46	Gourdon	Gourdon	46,838	1,762	27	97
47	Agen	Agen	120,499	1,013	119	71
47	Marmande	Marmande	83,647	1,388	60	98
47	Nérac	Nérac	39,020	1,400	28	58
47	Villeneuve-sur-Lot	Villeneuve-sur-Lot	89,667	1,560	57	92
48	Florac-Trois-Rivières	Florac	13,242	1,687	8	38
48	Mende	Mende	63,180	3,479	18	114
49	Angers	Angers	380,215	1,741	218	66
49	Cholet	Cholet	224,581	2,103	107	32
49	Saumur	Saumur	135,333	1,968	69	52
49	Segré	Segré	70,805	1,296	55	27
50	Avranches	Avranches	134,724	1,888	71	134
50	Cherbourg-en-Cotentin	Cherbourg	189,748	1,644	115	144
50	Coutances	Coutances	70,845	1,142	62	81
50	Saint-Lô	Saint-Lô	103,045	1,277	81	87
51	Châlons-en-Champagne	Châlons-en-Champagne	109,916	2,612	42	150
51	Épernay	Épernay	120,269	2,722	44	210
51	Reims	Reims	294,674	1,432	206	143
51	Vitry-le-François	Vitry-le-François	46,024	1,402	33	110
52	Chaumont	Chaumont	64,148	2,476	26	158
52	Langres	Langres	43,943	2,163	20	157
52	Saint-Dizier	Saint-Dizier	69,993	1,571	45	111
53	Château-Gontier	Château-Gontier	73,769	1,527	48	76
53	Laval	Laval	112,937	686	165	34
53	Mayenne	Mayenne	120,982	2,962	41	132
54	Lunéville	Lunéville	78,662	1,451	54	164
54	Nancy	Nancy	419,699	1,509	278	188
54	Toul	Toul	69,151	1,143	60	111
54	Val de Briey	Val-de-Briey	166,309	1,143	146	128
55	Bar-le-Duc	Bar-le-Duc	59,980	1,451	41	110
55	Commercy	Commercy	43,511	1,932	23	135
55	Verdun	Verdun	85,564	2,829	30	254
56	Lorient	Lorient	312,063	1,462	214	58
56	Pontivy	Pontivy	155,521	2,945	53	93
56	Vannes	Vannes	279,964	2,416	116	99
57	Forbach	Forbach-Boulay-Moselle	243,054	1,283	189	169
57	Metz	Metz	344,203	1,089	316	139
57	Sarrebourg	Sarrebourg-Château-Salins	92,282	1,967	47	230
57	Sarreguemines	Sarreguemines	99,226	936	106	83
57	Thionville	Thionville	266,506	941	283	104
58	Château-Chinon	Château-Chinon	28,291	2,168	13	80
58	Clamecy	Clamecy	21,364	1,228	17	84
58	Cosne-Cours-sur-Loire	Cosne-Cours-sur-Loire	43,893	1,395	31	63
58	Nevers	Nevers	115,613	2,025	57	82
59	Avesnes-sur-Helpe	Avesnes-sur-Helpe	230,372	1,408	164	151
59	Cambrai	Cambrai	162,045	902	180	116
59	Douai	Douai	245,280	477	515	64
59	Dunkirk	Dunkerque	377,294	1,443	262	111
59	Lille	Lille	1,237,472	880	1,407	124
59	Valenciennes	Valenciennes	351,260	635	553	82
60	Beauvais	Beauvais	229,183	2,100	109	245
60	Clermont	Clermont	130,333	1,142	114	146
60	Compiègne	Compiègne	182,266	1,275	143	156
60	Senlis	Senlis	281,760	1,344	210	132
61	Alençon	Alençon	86,907	1,549	56	111
61	Argentan	Argentan	110,239	1,904	58	123
61	Mortagne-au-Perche	Mortagne-au-Perche	88,162	2,651	33	151
62	Arras	Arras	248,929	2,245	111	357
62	Béthune	Béthune	293,991	707	416	104
62	Boulogne-sur-Mer	Boulogne-sur-Mer	159,748	634	252	74
62	Calais	Calais	158,492	593	267	52
62	Lens	Lens	367,839	352	1,047	50
62	Montreuil	Montreuil	112,118	1,327	84	164
62	Saint-Omer	Saint-Omer	129,608	813	159	89
63	Ambert	Ambert	27,606	1,230	22	58
63	Clermont-Ferrand	Clermont-Ferrand	354,048	913	388	74
63	Issoire	Issoire	77,561	2,268	34	133
63	Riom	Riom	135,164	2,705	50	155
63	Thiers	Thiers	56,321	854	66	44
64	Bayonne	Bayonne	293,590	2,268	130	122
64	Oloron-Sainte-Marie	Oloron-Sainte-Marie	72,504	2,828	26	155
64	Pau	Pau	307,892	2,549	121	269
65	Argelès-Gazost	Argelès-Gazost	38,002	1,300	29	87
65	Bagnères-de-Bigorre	Bagnères-de-Bigorre	48,866	1,784	27	170
65	Tarbes	Tarbes	140,961	1,380	102	212
66	Céret	Céret	129,464	1,214	107	64
66	Perpignan	Perpignan	285,077	721	396	39
66	Prades	Prades	59,828	2,181	27	123
67	Haguenau	Haguenau-Wissembourg	240,942	1,425	169	141
67	Molsheim	Molsheim	103,633	771	134	77
67	Saverne	Saverne	128,960	1,241	104	162
67	Sélestat	Sélestat-Erstein	156,463	981	160	101
67	Strasbourg	Strasbourg	491,409	338	1,456	33
68	Altkirch	Altkirch	69,793	663	105	108
68	Colmar	Colmar-Ribeauvillé	211,668	1,248	170	98
68	Mulhouse	Mulhouse	351,012	707	496	79
68	Thann	Thann-Guebwiller	130,270	907	144	81
69	Lyon	Lyon	1,585,411	1,535	1,033	135
69	Villefranche-sur-Saône	Villefranche-sur-Saône	250,492	1,715	146	132
70	Lure	Lure	109,260	1,906	57	193
70	Vesoul	Vesoul	127,982	3,454	37	346
71	Autun	Autun	131,392	1,994	66	89
71	Chalon-sur-Saône	Chalon-sur-Saône	156,331	1,485	105	142
71	Charolles	Charolles	87,416	2,444	36	126
71	Louhans-Châteaurenaud	Louhans	67,030	1,430	47	88
71	Mâcon	Mâcon	112,854	1,222	92	120
72	La Flèche	La Flèche	152,008	2,521	60	118
72	Mamers	Mamers	152,556	2,905	53	191
72	Le Mans	Le Mans	262,997	780	337	45
73	Albertville	Albertville	111,751	2,466	45	69
73	Chambéry	Chambéry	274,839	1,586	173	151
73	Saint-Jean-de-Maurienne	Saint-Jean-de-Maurienne	43,091	1,976	22	53
74	Annecy	Annecy	282,319	1,262	224	79
74	Bonneville	Bonneville	186,945	1,558	120	60
74	Saint-Julien-en-Genevois	Saint-Julien-en-Genevois	186,343	660	282	72
74	Thonon-les-Bains	Thonon-les-Bains	145,809	908	161	68
75	Paris	Paris	2,190,327	105	20,781	1
76	Dieppe	Dieppe	237,203	3,120	76	343
76	Le Havre	Le Havre	387,520	1,221	317	149
76	Rouen	Rouen	631,032	1,936	326	216
77	Fontainebleau	Fontainebleau	156,193	1,229	127	85
77	Meaux	Meaux	343,169	1,354	253	142
77	Melun	Melun	278,808	617	452	59
77	Provins	Provins	187,405	2,361	79	176
77	Torcy	Torcy	432,090	355	1,218	45
78	Mantes-la-Jolie	Mantes-la-Jolie	271,436	759	358	109
78	Rambouillet	Rambouillet	228,196	987	231	83
78	Saint-Germain-en-Laye	Saint-Germain-en-Laye	518,220	351	1,477	44
78	Versailles	Versailles	413,956	187	2,211	23
79	Bressuire	Bressuire	109,393	1,939	56	57
79	Niort	Niort	199,177	2,445	81	121
79	Parthenay	Parthenay	66,173	1,615	41	78
80	Abbeville	Abbeville	125,867	1,561	81	164
80	Amiens	Amiens	304,282	2,343	130	291
80	Montdidier	Montdidier	47,700	782	61	109
80	Péronne	Péronne	94,895	1,485	64	208
81	Albi	Albi	191,150	2,732	70	163
81	Castres	Castres	195,298	3,026	65	151
82	Castelsarrasin	Castelsarrasin	77,423	1,602	48	103
82	Montauban	Montauban	179,474	2,117	85	92
83	Brignoles	Brignoles	181,649	2,518	72	67
83	Draguignan	Draguignan	306,320	2,221	138	54
83	Toulon	Toulon	567,852	1,234	460	32
84	Apt	Apt	128,793	1,391	93	57
84	Avignon	Avignon	214,340	370	580	17
84	Carpentras	Carpentras	215,881	1,807	120	77
85	Fontenay-le-Comte	Fontenay-le-Comte	141,620	2,316	61	110
85	La Roche-sur-Yon	La Roche-sur-Yon	293,895	2,489	118	77
85	Les Sables-d'Olonne	Les Sables-d'Olonne	235,082	1,915	123	71
86	Châtellerault	Châtellerault	109,345	1,983	55	92
86	Montmorillon	Montmorillon	67,025	2,876	23	91
86	Poitiers	Poitiers	259,699	2,132	122	83
87	Bellac	Bellac	39,204	1,780	22	57
87	Limoges	Limoges	297,957	2,945	101	108
87	Rochechouart	Rochechouart	37,817	795	48	30
88	Épinal	Épinal	204,222	2,598	79	236
88	Neufchâteau	Neufchâteau	53,669	1,817	30	175
88	Saint-Dié-des-Vosges	Saint-Dié-des-Vosges	111,750	1,458	77	96
89	Auxerre	Auxerre	165,987	3,432	48	170
89	Avallon	Avallon	43,189	2,079	21	135
89	Sens	Sens	131,368	1,917	69	118
90	Belfort	Belfort	144,089	609	236	101
91	Étampes	Étampes	130,464	851	153	75
91	Évry-Courcouronnes	Évry	536,258	469	1,143	51
91	Palaiseau	Palaiseau	620,608	484	1,282	68
92	Antony	Antony	396,552	47	8,373	11
92	Boulogne-Billancourt	Boulogne-Billancourt	318,535	36	8,729	8
92	Nanterre	Nanterre	888,181	92	9,679	17
93	Bobigny	Bobigny	415,958	39	10,617	9
93	Le Raincy	Le Raincy	755,392	150	5,049	22
93	Saint-Denis	Saint-Denis	435,309	47	9,184	9
94	Créteil	Créteil	310,758	100	3,114	16
94	L'Haÿ-les-Roses	L'Haÿ-les-Roses	558,539	89	6,283	18
94	Nogent-sur-Marne	Nogent-sur-Marne	508,854	56	9,033	13
95	Argenteuil	Argenteuil	412,334	109	3,796	17
95	Pontoise	Pontoise	338,425	766	442	105
95	Sarcelles	Sarcelles	471,164	371	1,269	62
971	Basse-Terre	Basse-Terre	189,210	854	222	18
971	Pointe-à-Pitre	Pointe-à-Pitre	204,900	774	265	14
972	Fort-de-France	Fort-de-France	157,449	171	921	4
972	Le Marin	Le Marin	117,168	409	286	12
972	Saint-Pierre	Saint-Pierre	22,926	210	109	8
972	La Trinité	La Trinité	78,937	338	234	10
973	Cayenne	Cayenne	176,357	42,589	4	14
973	Saint-Laurent-du-Maroni	Saint-Laurent-du-Maroni	92,995	40,945	2	8
974	Saint-Benoît	Saint-Benoît	126,777	736	172	6
974	Saint-Denis	Saint-Denis	204,304	288	710	3
974	Saint-Paul	Saint-Paul	214,073	537	399	5
974	Saint-Pierre	Saint-Pierre	307,770	943	326	10

== Lists by departments ==
#	Department	List of arrondissements
01	Ain	Arrondissements of the Ain department
02	Aisne	Arrondissements of the Aisne department
03	Allier	Arrondissements of the Allier department
04	Alpes-de-Haute-Provence	Arrondissements of the Alpes-de-Haute-Provence department
05	Hautes-Alpes	Arrondissements of the Hautes-Alpes department
06	Alpes-Maritimes	Arrondissements of the Alpes-Maritimes department
07	Ardèche	Arrondissements of the Ardèche department
08	Ardennes	Arrondissements of the Ardennes department
09	Ariège	Arrondissements of the Ariège department
10	Aube	Arrondissements of the Aube department
11	Aude	Arrondissements of the Aude department
12	Aveyron	Arrondissements of the Aveyron department
13	Bouches-du-Rhône	Arrondissements of the Bouches-du-Rhône department
14	Calvados	Arrondissements of the Calvados department
15	Cantal	Arrondissements of the Cantal department
16	Charente	Arrondissements of the Charente department
17	Charente-Maritime	Arrondissements of the Charente-Maritime department
18	Cher	Arrondissements of the Cher department
19	Corrèze	Arrondissements of the Corrèze department
2A	Corse-du-Sud	Arrondissements of the Corse-du-Sud department
2B	Haute-Corse	Arrondissements of the Haute-Corse department
21	Côte-d'Or	Arrondissements of the Côte-d'Or department
22	Côtes-d'Armor	Arrondissements of the Côtes-d'Armor department
23	Creuse	Arrondissements of the Creuse department
24	Dordogne	Arrondissements of the Dordogne department
25	Doubs	Arrondissements of the Doubs department
26	Drôme	Arrondissements of the Drôme department
27	Eure	Arrondissements of the Eure department
28	Eure-et-Loir	Arrondissements of the Eure-et-Loir department
29	Finistère	Arrondissements of the Finistère department
30	Gard	Arrondissements of the Gard department
31	Haute-Garonne	Arrondissements of the Haute-Garonne department
32	Gers	Arrondissements of the Gers department
33	Gironde	Arrondissements of the Gironde department
34	Hérault	Arrondissements of the Hérault department
35	Ille-et-Vilaine	Arrondissements of the Ille-et-Vilaine department
36	Indre	Arrondissements of the Indre department
37	Indre-et-Loire	Arrondissements of the Indre-et-Loire department
38	Isère	Arrondissements of the Isère department
39	Jura	Arrondissements of the Jura department
40	Landes	Arrondissements of the Landes department
41	Loir-et-Cher	Arrondissements of the Loir-et-Cher department
42	Loire	Arrondissements of the Loire department
43	Haute-Loire	Arrondissements of the Haute-Loire department
44	Loire-Atlantique	Arrondissements of the Loire-Atlantique department
45	Loiret	Arrondissements of the Loiret department
46	Lot	Arrondissements of the Lot department
47	Lot-et-Garonne	Arrondissements of the Lot-et-Garonne department
48	Lozère	Arrondissements of the Lozère department
49	Maine-et-Loire	Arrondissements of the Maine-et-Loire department
50	Manche	Arrondissements of the Manche department
51	Marne	Arrondissements of the Marne department
52	Haute-Marne	Arrondissements of the Haute-Marne department
53	Mayenne	Arrondissements of the Mayenne department
54	Meurthe-et-Moselle	Arrondissements of the Meurthe-et-Moselle department
55	Meuse	Arrondissements of the Meuse department
56	Morbihan	Arrondissements of the Morbihan department
57	Moselle	Arrondissements of the Moselle department
58	Nièvre	Arrondissements of the Nièvre department
59	Nord	Arrondissements of the Nord department
60	Oise	Arrondissements of the Oise department
61	Orne	Arrondissements of the Orne department
62	Pas-de-Calais	Arrondissements of the Pas-de-Calais department
63	Puy-de-Dôme	Arrondissements of the Puy-de-Dôme department
64	Pyrénées-Atlantiques	Arrondissements of the Pyrénées-Atlantiques department
65	Hautes-Pyrénées	Arrondissements of the Hautes-Pyrénées department
66	Pyrénées-Orientales	Arrondissements of the Pyrénées-Orientales department
67	Bas-Rhin	Arrondissements of the Bas-Rhin department
68	Haut-Rhin	Arrondissements of the Haut-Rhin department
69	Rhône	Arrondissements of the Rhône department
70	Haute-Saône	Arrondissements of the Haute-Saône department
71	Saône-et-Loire	Arrondissements of the Saône-et-Loire department
72	Sarthe	Arrondissements of the Sarthe department
73	Savoie	Arrondissements of the Savoie department
74	Haute-Savoie	Arrondissements of the Haute-Savoie department
75	Paris	Arrondissement of Paris
76	Seine-Maritime	Arrondissements of the Seine-Maritime department
77	Seine-et-Marne	Arrondissements of the Seine-et-Marne department
78	Yvelines	Arrondissements of the Yvelines department
79	Deux-Sèvres	Arrondissements of the Deux-Sèvres department
80	Somme	Arrondissements of the Somme department
81	Tarn	Arrondissements of the Tarn department
82	Tarn-et-Garonne	Arrondissements of the Tarn-et-Garonne department
83	Var	Arrondissements of the Var department
84	Vaucluse	Arrondissements of the Vaucluse department
85	Vendée	Arrondissements of the Vendée department
86	Vienne	Arrondissements of the Vienne department
87	Haute-Vienne	Arrondissements of the Haute-Vienne department
88	Vosges	Arrondissements of the Vosges department
89	Yonne	Arrondissements of the Yonne department
90	Territoire de Belfort	Arrondissements of the Territoire de Belfort department
91	Essonne	Arrondissements of the Essonne department
92	Hauts-de-Seine	Arrondissements of the Hauts-de-Seine department
93	Seine-Saint-Denis	Arrondissements of the Seine-Saint-Denis department
94	Val-de-Marne	Arrondissements of the Val-de-Marne department
95	Val-d'Oise	Arrondissements of the Val-d'Oise department

Overseas departments of France

Mayotte has no arrondissements.

#	Department	List of arrondissements
971	Guadeloupe	Arrondissements of the Guadeloupe department
972	Martinique	Arrondissements of the Martinique department
973	Guyane	Arrondissements of the Guyane department
974	Réunion	Arrondissements of the Réunion department
