= Laurent Cathala =

French politician

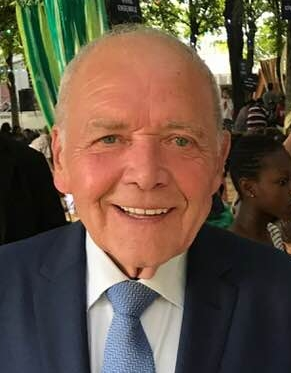
- Cathala in 2019

Mayor of Créteil
- Incumbent
- Assumed office 14 March 1977
- Preceded by: Pierre Billotte

Member of the National Assembly for Val-de-Marne's 2nd constituency
- In office 2 April 1993 – 20 June 2017
- Preceded by: David Bohbot
- Succeeded by: Jean François Mbaye

Personal details
- Born: 21 September 1945 (age 80) Saint-Jean-de-Barrou, France
- Party: Socialist Party

Laurent Cathala (born 21 September 1945) is the mayor of Créteil since 1977 and is a former member of the National Assembly of France. He represented the Val-de-Marne department, and is a member of the Socialist Party.

== Biography ==
A state-certified nurse who trained at Lariboisière Hospital in Paris, Laurent Cathala worked as a senior nurse for the Assistance publique at Henri-Mondor Hospital in Créteil from 1970 to 1977.

Elected representative of Val-de-Marne in 1993, then re-elected until 2017, when he did not stand for re-election due to the application of the law on the non-accumulation of mandates, he is a member of the Socialists and affiliated group.

On January 27, 2016, he became the first president of the T11 Public Territorial Institution (now the Grand Paris Sud Est Avenir Public Territorial Institution), a new intermunicipal structure in the southeast of Val-de-Marne created as part of the Grand Paris project. He was elected by 36 votes to 34 against the favorite, MoDem representative Jean-Jacques Jégou, with 3 blank votes and 1 invalid vote.

He was a member of Arnaud Montebourg's campaign team for the 2017 Socialist presidential primary.
