= Arrondissements of the Lot department =

Administrative divisions of Lot, France

Coordinates: 44.608398°N 1.670364°E

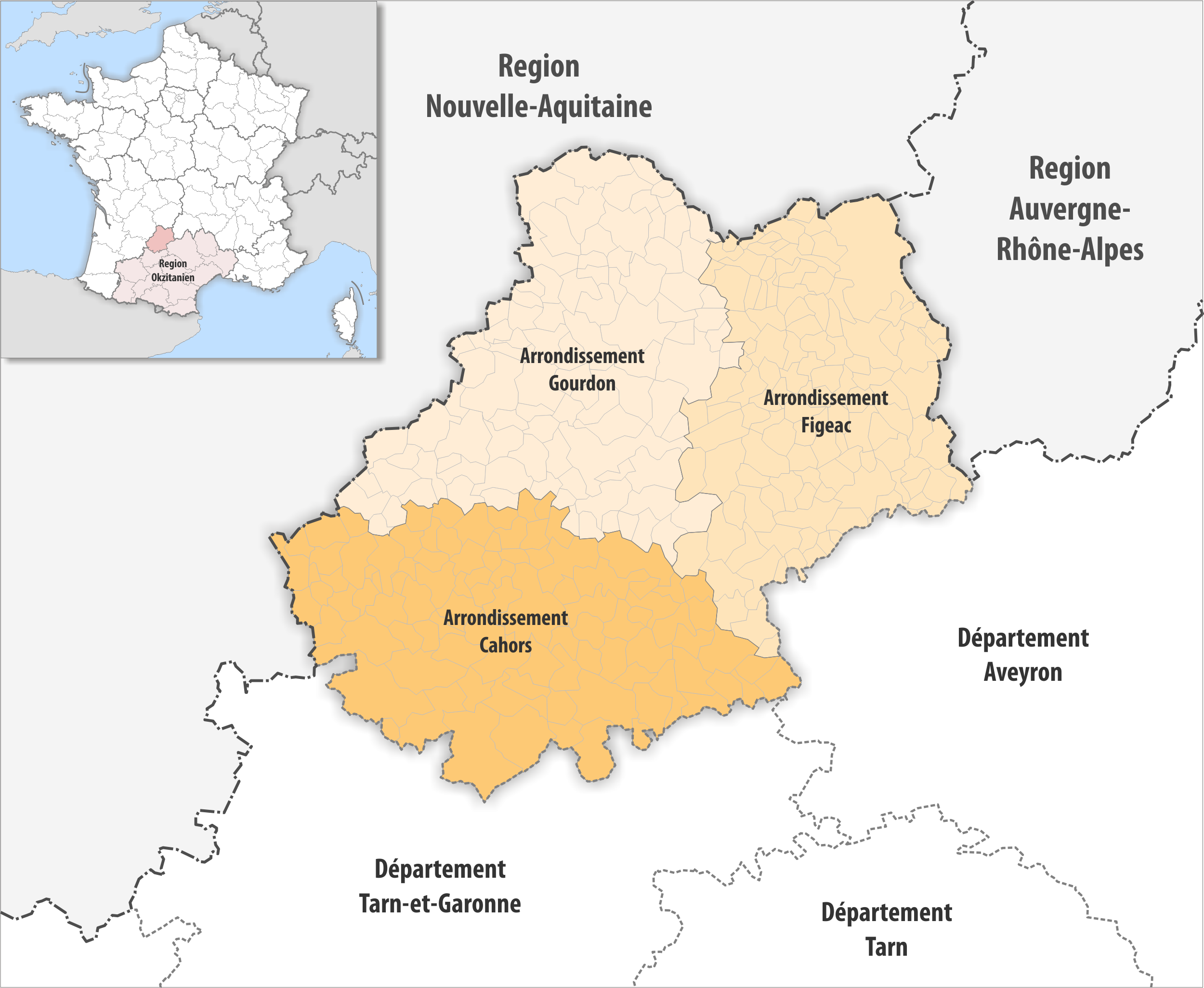
Map of arrondissements of the Lot department.

The 3 arrondissements of the Lot department are:

1. Arrondissement of Cahors, (prefecture of the Lot department: Cahors) with 98 communes. The population of the arrondissement was 73,707 in 2021.
2. Arrondissement of Figeac, (subprefecture: Figeac) with 118 communes. The population of the arrondissement was 54,750 in 2021.
3. Arrondissement of Gourdon, (subprefecture: Gourdon) with 97 communes. The population of the arrondissement was 46,485 in 2021.

== History ==
In 1800 the arrondissements of Cahors, Figeac, Gourdon and Montauban were established. The arrondissement of Montauban was ceded to the new department Tarn-et-Garonne in 1808. All of the remaining arrondissements have never disbanded.

The borders of the arrondissements of Lot were modified in January 2017:

- two communes from the arrondissement of Cahors to the arrondissement of Figeac
- 18 communes from the arrondissement of Cahors to the arrondissement of Gourdon
