= Jean François Mbaye =

French politician

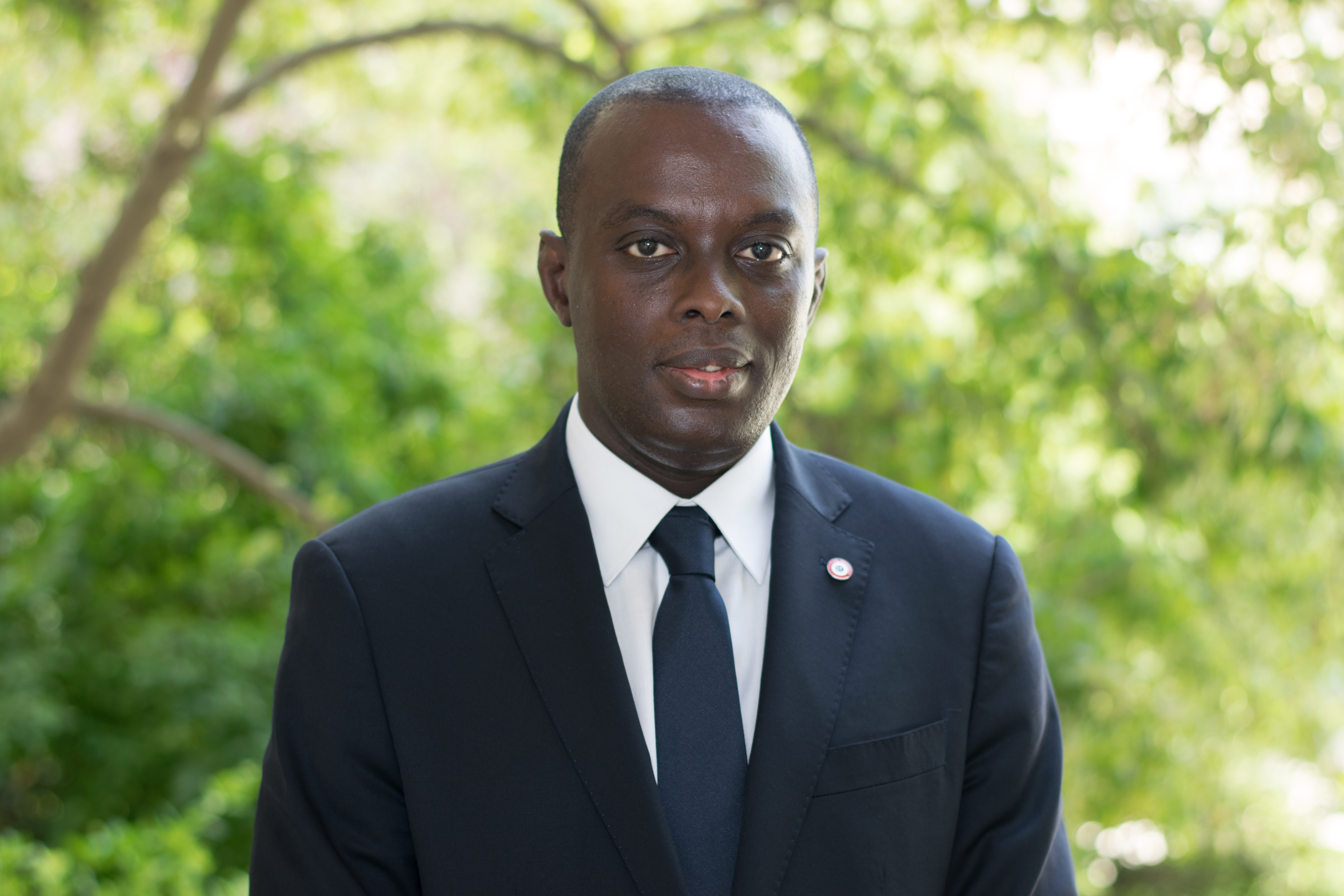

Member of the National Assembly for Val-de-Marne's 2nd constituency
- In office 21 June 2017 – 21 June 2022
- Preceded by: Laurent Cathala
- Succeeded by: Clémence Guetté

Personal details
- Born: 1 January 1979 (age 47) Dakar, Senegal
- Party: Renaissance

Jean François Mbaye is a Senegalese-born French politician of Renaissance (RE) who served as a member of the French National Assembly from 2017 to 2022, representing the department of Val-de-Marne.

== Political career ==
In parliament, Mbaye served on the Committee on Foreign Affairs. In addition to his committee assignments, he chaired the French-Gambian Parliamentary Friendship Group.

In early 2019, Mbaye received a racist letter in which the unnamed author promised him “a bullet in the head”; in response, he pressed charges.

In 2020, Mbaye joined En Commun (EC), a group within LREM led by Barbara Pompili.

He lost his seat in the 2022 French legislative election.

== Political positions ==
In July 2019, Mbaye was one of nine LREM members who voted against his parliamentary group's majority and opposed the French ratification of the European Union's Comprehensive Economic and Trade Agreement (CETA) with Canada.

== Other activities ==
- UNITE – Parliamentary Network to End HIV/AIDS, Viral Hepatitis and Other Infectious Diseases, Member (since 2019)

== See also ==
- 2017 French legislative election
