= Arrondissements of the Réunion department =

Administrative divisions of Réunion, France

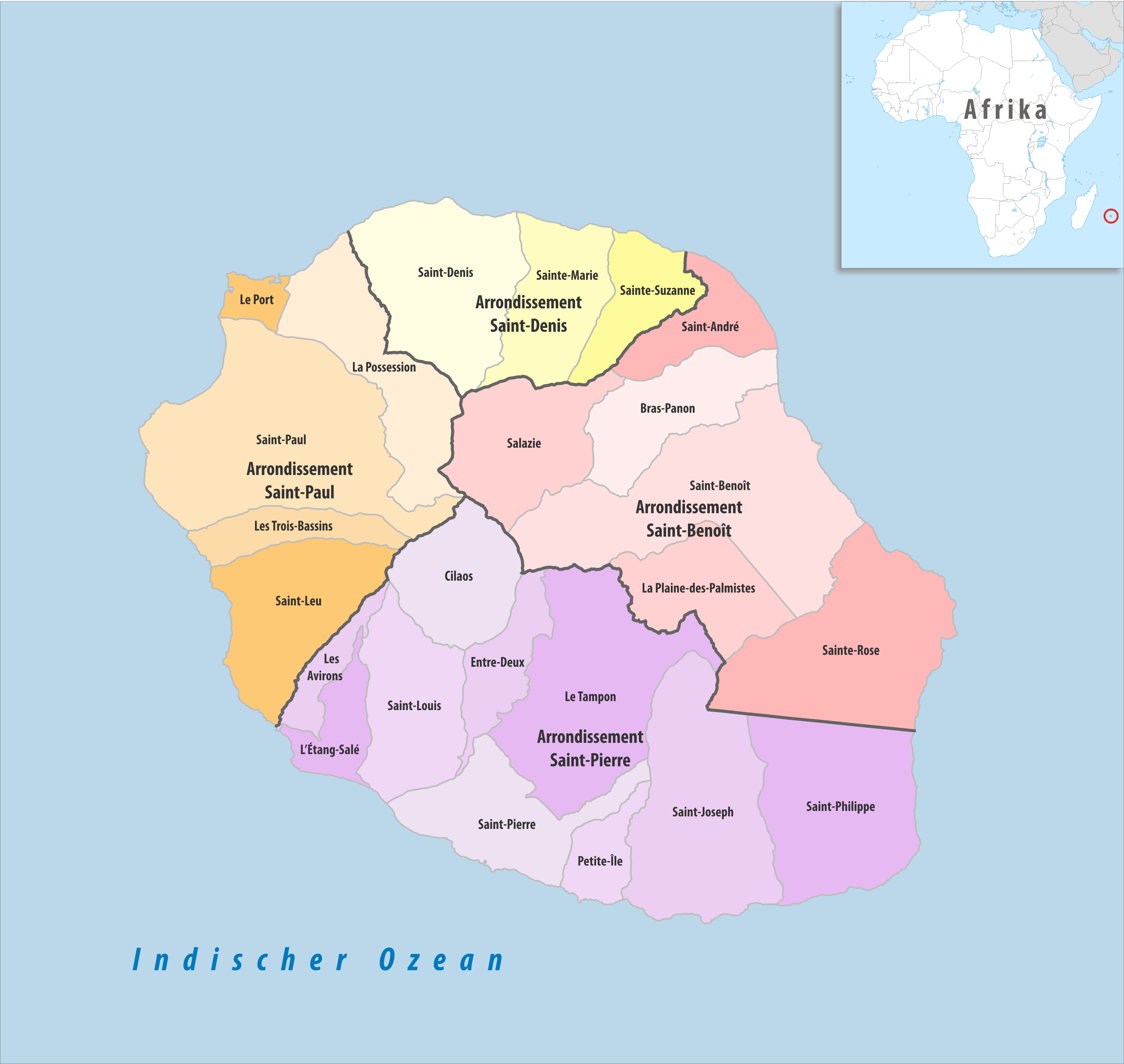
Map of the arrondissements of Réunion.

The 4 arrondissements of the Réunion department are:

1. Arrondissement of Saint-Benoît, (subprefecture: Saint-Benoît) with 6 communes. The population of the arrondissement was 127,924 in 2021.
2. Arrondissement of Saint-Denis, (prefecture of the Réunion department: Saint-Denis) with 3 communes. The population of the arrondissement was 213,402 in 2021.
3. Arrondissement of Saint-Paul, (subprefecture: Saint-Paul) with 5 communes. The population of the arrondissement was 215,613 in 2021.
4. Arrondissement of Saint-Pierre, (subprefecture: Saint-Pierre) with 10 communes. The population of the arrondissement was 314,218 in 2021.

== History ==
At the creation of the department of Réunion in 1947, its only arrondissement was Saint-Denis. The arrondissement of Saint-Pierre, containing 11 communes that were previously part of the arrondissement of Saint-Denis, was created in 1964. The arrondissement of Saint-Benoît, containing six communes that were previously part of the arrondissement of Saint-Denis, was created in 1968. The arrondissement of Saint-Paul, containing four communes that were previously part of the arrondissement of Saint-Pierre and one commune that was previously part of the arrondissement of Saint-Denis, was created in 1969.

The borders of the arrondissements of Réunion were modified in September 2006:

- the communes Le Port and La Possession were transferred from the arrondissement of Saint-Denis to the arrondissement of Saint-Paul
- the communes Les Avirons and L'Étang-Salé were transferred from the arrondissement of Saint-Paul to the arrondissement of Saint-Pierre

== See also ==
- Cantons of the Réunion department
- Communes of the Réunion department
