= Arrondissements of the Pyrénées-Orientales department =

Administrative divisions of Pyrénées-Orientales, France

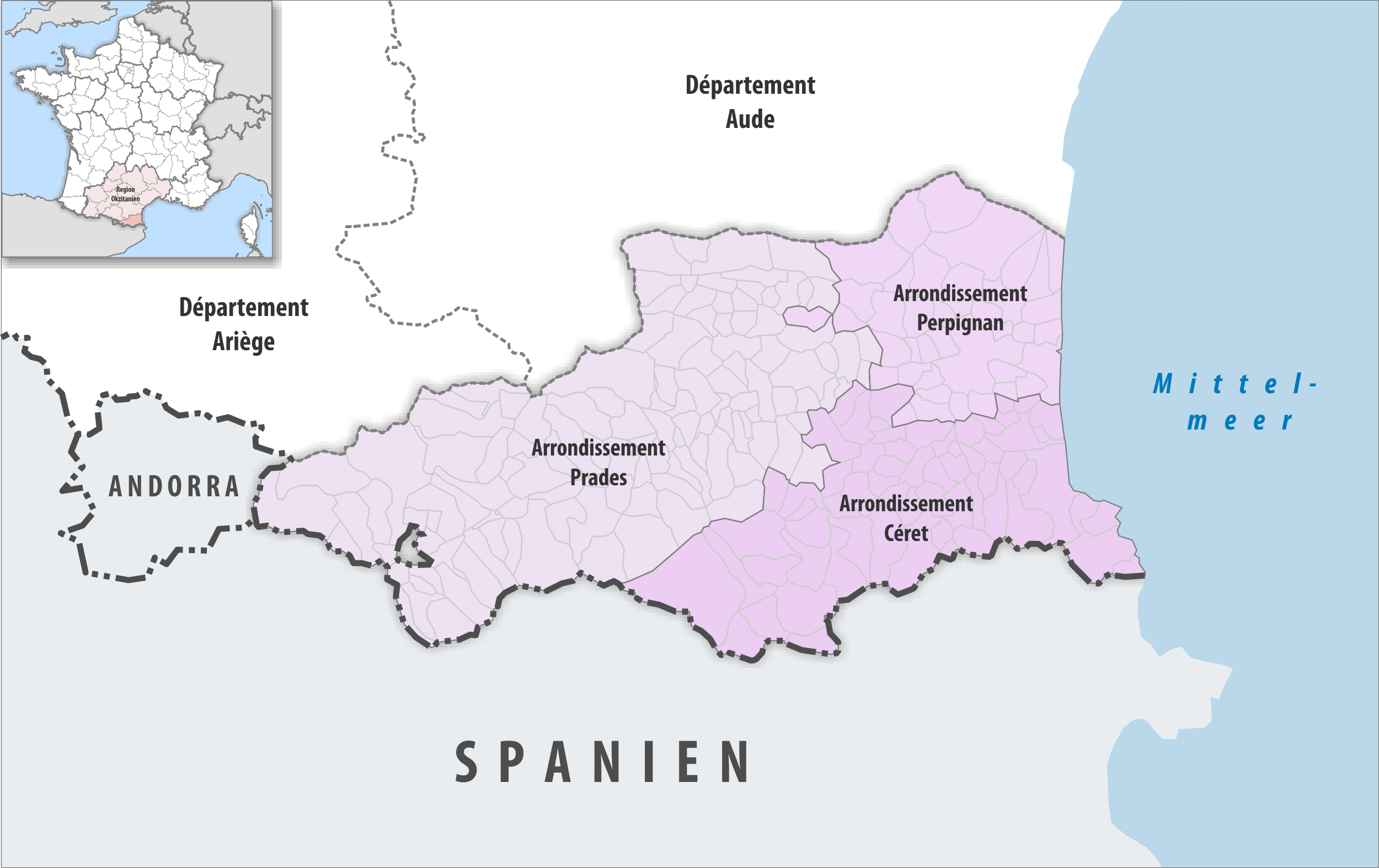
Map of arrondissements of the Pyrénées-Orientales department.

The 3 arrondissements of the Pyrénées-Orientales department are:

1. Arrondissement of Céret, (subprefecture: Céret) with 64 communes. The population of the arrondissement was 134,629 in 2021.
2. Arrondissement of Perpignan, (prefecture of the Pyrénées-Orientales department: Perpignan) with 39 communes. The population of the arrondissement was 292,142 in 2021.
3. Arrondissement of Prades, (subprefecture: Prades) with 123 communes. The population of the arrondissement was 60,536 in 2021.

== History ==
In 1800 the arrondissements of Perpignan, Céret and Prades were established. All of them was never disbanded.

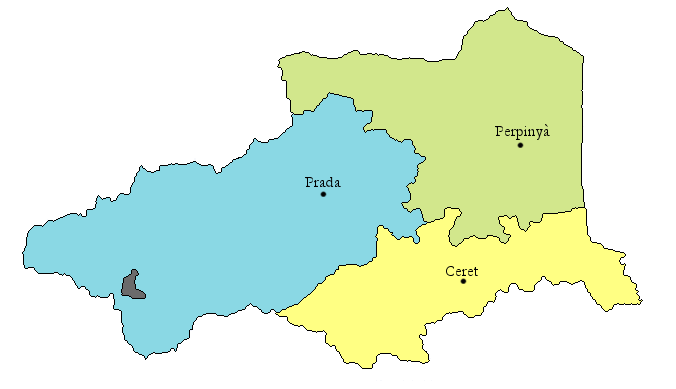
Map of the three arrondissements before 2017

The borders of the arrondissements of Pyrénées-Orientales were modified in January 2017:

- 24 communes from the arrondissement of Perpignan to the arrondissement of Céret
- 23 communes from the arrondissement of Perpignan to the arrondissement of Prades
