= Arrondissements of the Tarn-et-Garonne department =

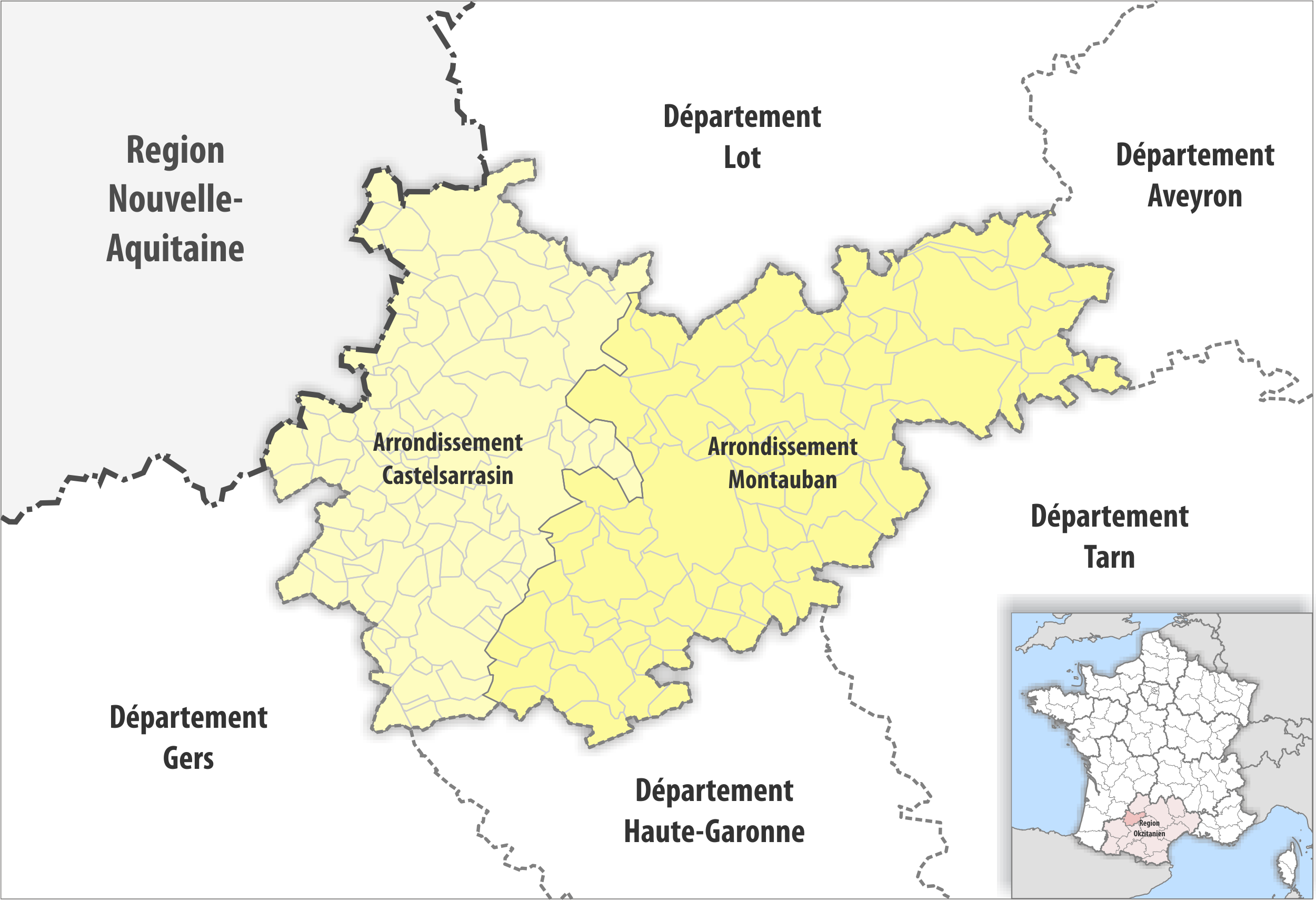
Map of arrondissements of the Tarn-et-Garonne department.

The 2 arrondissements of the Tarn-et-Garonne department of France are:

1. Arrondissement of Castelsarrasin, (subprefecture: Castelsarrasin) with 103 communes. The population of the arrondissement was 78,979 in 2021.
2. Arrondissement of Montauban, (prefecture of the Tarn-et-Garonne department: Montauban) with 92 communes. The population of the arrondissement was 184,398 in 2021.

== History ==
In 1800, the arrondissement of Montauban was created as a part of the department Lot, and the arrondissement of Castelsarrasin as a part of the department Haute-Garonne. In 1808 the department of Tarn-et-Garonne was created, with the arrondissements of Montauban, Castelsarrasin and Moissac. The arrondissement of Moissac was disbanded in 1926.
