= Clémence Guetté =

French politician (born 1991)

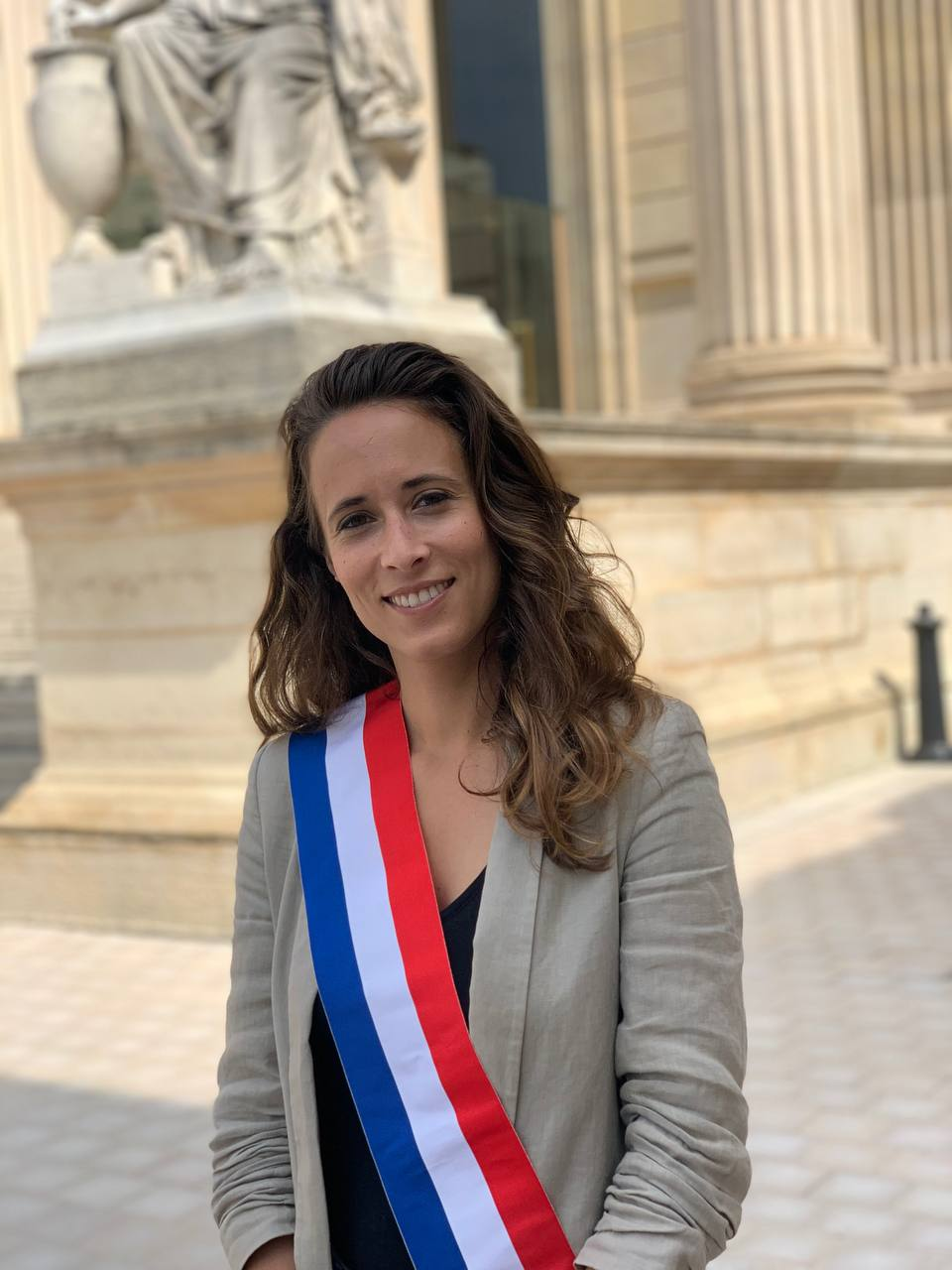
- Clémence Guetté in 2022

Member of the National Assembly for Val-de-Marne's 2nd constituency
- Incumbent
- Assumed office 22 June 2022
- Preceded by: Jean François Mbaye

Personal details
- Born: 15 March 1991 (age 35) Bressuire, Deux-Sèvres, France
- Party: La France Insoumise (2016–present)
- Other political affiliations: Left Party (2010–present)
- Education: University of Poitiers

Clémence Guetté (born 15 March 1991) is a French politician from La France Insoumise (LFI). She was elected member of the National Assembly in Val-de-Marne's 2nd constituency in the 2022 French legislative election and in the 2024 French legislative election.

== See also ==
- List of deputies of the 16th National Assembly of France
- List of deputies of the 17th National Assembly of France
