= Arrondissements of the Val-de-Marne department =

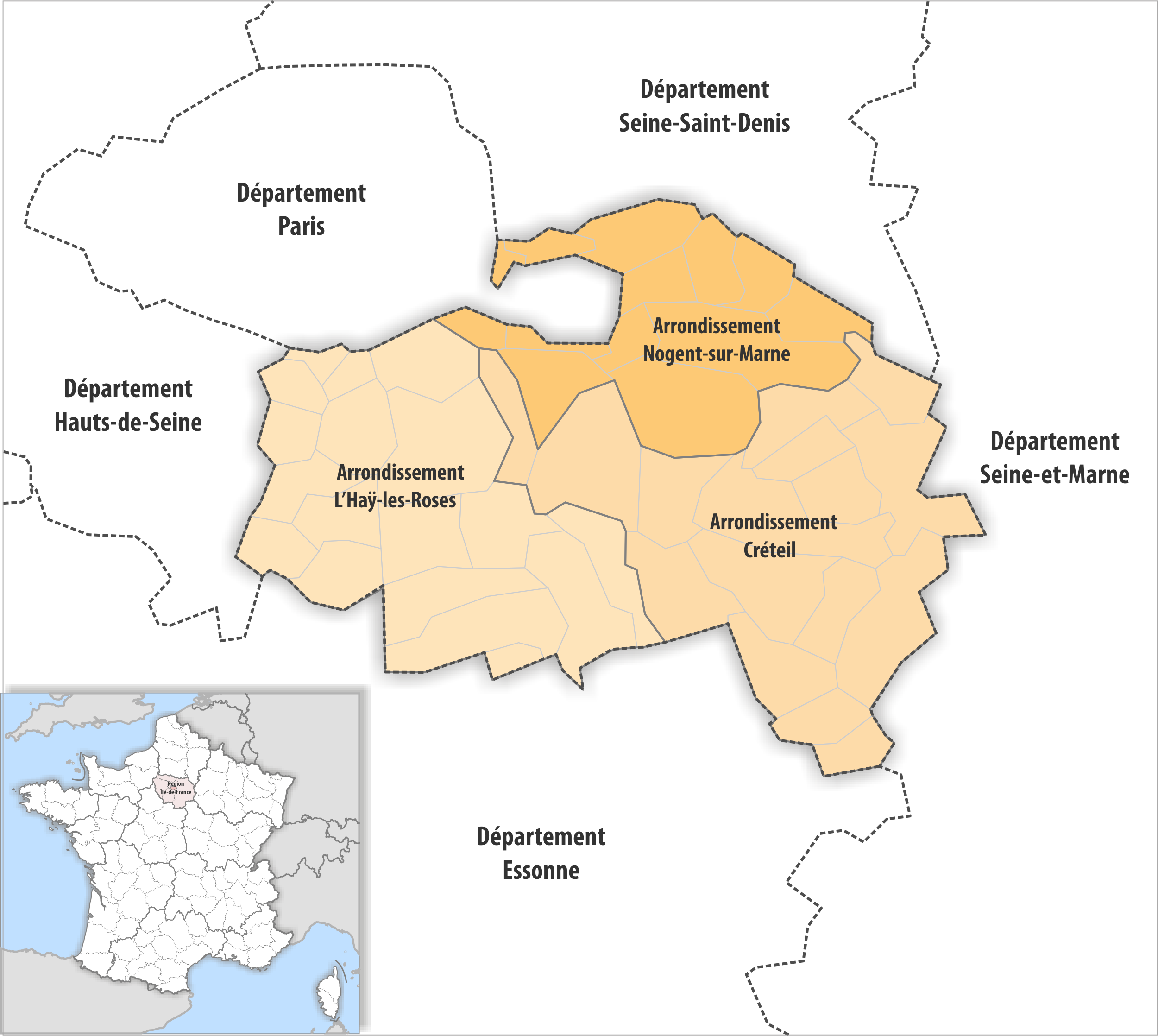
Map of arrondissements of the Val-de-Marne department.

The 3 arrondissements of the Val-de-Marne department are:

1. Arrondissement of Créteil, (prefecture of the Val-de-Marne department: Créteil) with 16 communes. The population of the arrondissement was 323,676 in 2021.
2. Arrondissement of L'Haÿ-les-Roses, (subprefecture: L'Haÿ-les-Roses) with 18 communes. The population of the arrondissement was 578,438 in 2021.
3. Arrondissement of Nogent-sur-Marne, (subprefecture: Nogent-sur-Marne) with 13 communes. The population of the arrondissement was 513,253 in 2021.

== History ==
As parts of the department Seine, the arrondissement of Créteil was established in 1964, and the arrondissement of Nogent-sur-Marne in 1966. In 1968 the department Val-de-Marne was created from parts of the former departments Seine and Seine-et-Oise, and the arrondissements of Créteil and Nogent-sur-Marne became part of it. The arrondissement of L'Haÿ-les-Roses was created in January 1973.

The borders of the arrondissements of Val-de-Marne were modified in February 2017:

- eight communes from the arrondissement of Créteil to the arrondissement of L'Haÿ-les-Roses
- two communes from the arrondissement of Créteil to the arrondissement of Nogent-sur-Marne
- three communes from the arrondissement of Nogent-sur-Marne to the arrondissement of Créteil
