= Val-de-Marne's 2nd constituency =

Constituency of the National Assembly of France

2nd constituency of Val-de-Marne
- inline Constituency of the National Assembly of France

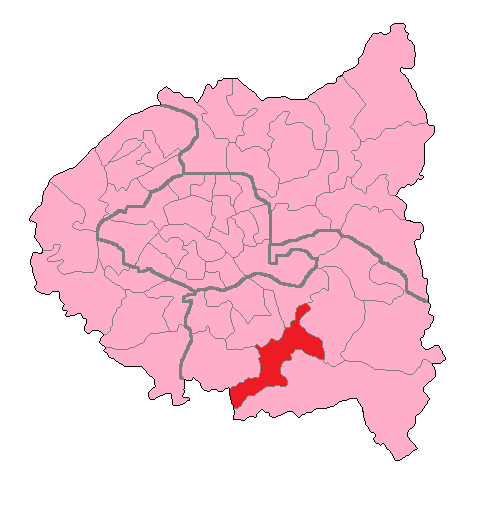
- Val-de-Marne's 2nd Constituency shown within Île-de-France
- Deputy: Clémence Guetté; LFI
- Department: Val-de-Marne
- Cantons: Choisy-le-Roi - Créteil-Ouest - Créteil-Sud - Orly
- Registered voters: 65,093

The 2nd constituency of Val-de-Marne is a French legislative constituency in the Val-de-Marne département.

== Description ==
The 2nd constituency of Val-de-Marne is a strip from the southern edge of the department into its centre and includes the towns of Créteil and Orly. Orly is famed for the airport which adjoins it.

This strongly working class seat elected Laurent Cathala of the PS at every election between 1988 and 2017.

== Historic Representation ==
Election	Member	Party
1967	Fernand Dupuy	PCF
1968	Fernand Dupuy	PCF
1973	Fernand Dupuy	PCF
1978	Charles Fiterman	PCF
1981	Pierre Tabanou	MRG
1986	Proportional representation – no election by constituency	
1988	Laurent Cathala	PS
1993	Laurent Cathala	PS
1997	Laurent Cathala	PS
2002	Laurent Cathala	PS
2007	Laurent Cathala	PS
2012	Laurent Cathala	PS
2017	Jean François Mbaye	LREM
2022	Clémence Guetté	LFI

== Election results ==
=== 2024 ===
Candidate	Party	Alliance	First round			Second round		
Candidate	Party	Alliance	Votes	%	+/–	Votes	%	+/–
Clémence Guetté	LFI	NFP	22,494	55.00	+7.54			
Antoine Ghaye	RN		7,153	17.49	+6.83			
Mehmet Ceylan	RE	ENS	6,559	16.04	-6.94			
Michel Sasportas	LR		2,103	5.14	-1.39			
Patricia Foffé	UDI		1,236	3.02	N/A			
Sabrina Pruvot	LO		546	1.34	+0.10			
Gérard Cruzille	REC		514	1.26	-2.15			
Manon Haller	EXG		291	0.71	N/A			
Clémence Boutarin	EXG		0	0.00	N/A			
Valid votes			40,896	97.66	+0.04			
Blank votes			600	1.43	-0.25			
Null votes			378	0.90	+0.21			
Turnout			65,377	64.05	+23.43			
Abstentions			23,503	35.95	-23.43			
Registered voters			65,377					
Source: Ministry of the Interior, Le Monde
Result						LFI HOLD		

=== 2022 ===
Legislative Election 2022: Val-de-Marne's 2nd constituency
Party	Candidate	Votes	%	±%
LFI (NUPÉS)	Clémence Guetté	12,440	47.46	+7.07
LREM (Ensemble)	Jean François Mbaye	6,024	22.98	-10.69
RN	Antoine Ghaye	2,792	10.65	+1.62
LR (UDC)	Frédéric Druart	1,713	6.53	−3.43
REC	Eloïse Laval	894	3.41	N/A
PRG	Coline Lardeux	804	3.07	N/A
Others	N/A	1,547		
Turnout		26,850	40.62	−0.77
2nd round result
LFI (NUPÉS)	Clémence Guetté	16,523	64.20	+16.78
LREM (Ensemble)	Jean François Mbaye	9,213	35.80	−16.78
Turnout		25,736	41.04	+4.56
LFI gain from LREM				

=== 2017 ===
Legislative Election 2017: Val-de-Marne's 2nd constituency
Party	Candidate	Votes	%	±%
LREM	Jean François Mbaye	8,616	33.67	N/A
LFI	François Cocq	4,766	18.62	N/A
PS	Axel Urgin	2,712	10.60	−37.26
LR	Thierry Hebbrecht	2,550	9.96	−8.31
FN	Gaétan Marzo	2,310	9.03	−2.15
PCF	Patrice Diguet	1,719	6.72	−6.26
EELV	Ali Id El Ouali	1,139	4.45	+1.07
DLF	Lionel Mazurié	587	2.29	N/A
Others	N/A	1,194		
Turnout		26,233	41.39	−7.49
2nd round result
LREM	Jean François Mbaye	11,184	52.58	N/A
LFI	François Cocq	10,087	47.42	N/A
Turnout		23,118	36.48	−9.29
LREM gain from PS		Swing		

=== 2012 ===
Legislative Election 2012: Val-de-Marne's 2nd constituency
Party	Candidate	Votes	%	±%
PS	Laurent Cathala	15,228	47.86	+9.02
UMP	Thierry Hebbrecht	5,814	18.27	−11.65
FG	Didier Guillaume	4,131	12.98	+4.93
FN	Annick Le Ruyet	3,557	11.18	+6.83
EELV	Catherine Calmet Reberioux	1,075	3.38	+0.23
Others	N/A	2,011		
Turnout		31,816	48.88	−5.78
2nd round result
PS	Laurent Cathala	20,713	69.52	+9.33
UMP	Thierry Hebbrecht	9,080	30.48	−9.33
Turnout		29,793	45.77	−6.29
PS hold				

=== 2007 ===
Legislative Election 2007: Val-de-Marne's 2nd constituency
Party	Candidate	Votes	%	±%
PS	Laurent Cathala	13,464	38.84	+4.22
UMP	Monique Baron	10,371	29.92	+11.08
PCF	Nadine Luc	2,791	8.05	−2.79
MoDem	Jérôme Piton	2,574	7.42	N/A
FN	Dominique Joly	1,508	4.35	−6.91
LV	Catherine De Luca	1,091	3.15	−0.68
Far left	Virginie Rajkumar	968	2.79	N/A
Others	N/A	1,900		
Turnout		35,233	54.66	−5.89
2nd round result
PS	Laurent Cathala	19,690	60.19	+3.62
UMP	Monique Baron	13,025	39.81	−3.62
Turnout		33,557	52.06	−2.86
PS hold				

=== 2002 ===
Legislative Election 2002: Val-de-Marne's 2nd constituency
Party	Candidate	Votes	%	±%
PS	Laurent Cathala	12,026	34.62	+2.45
UMP	Liliane Delwasse	6,546	18.84	−0.59
FN	Christophe Martin	3,912	11.26	−3.36
PCF	Daniel Davisse	3,765	10.84	−3.78
UDF	Jerome Piton	3,079	8.86	N/A
LV	Catherine Calmet Reberioux	1,330	3.83	+0.32
DVG	Francois Philippon	745	2.14	N/A
Others	N/A	3,339		
Turnout		35,374	60.55	−3.84
2nd round result
PS	Laurent Cathala	17,413	56.57	−7.95
UMP	Liliane Delwasse	13,367	43.43	+7.95
Turnout		32,085	54.92	−11.75
PS hold				

=== 1997 ===
Legislative Election 1997: Val-de-Marne's 2nd constituency
Party	Candidate	Votes	%	±%
PS	Laurent Cathala	11,776	32.17	
RPR	Marie-Michèle Bataille	7,112	19.43	
PCF	Daniel Davisse	5,352	14.62	
FN	Bruno Serignat	5,350	14.62	
Far left	Gaston Viens	1,838	5.02	
LV	Catherine Calmet-Reberioux	1,284	3.51	
LO	Christian Lecat	982	2.68	
Others	N/A	2,911		
Turnout		37,799	64.39	
2nd round result
PS	Laurent Cathala	23,919	64.52	
RPR	Marie-Michèle Bataille	13,152	35.48	
Turnout		39,133	66.67	
PS hold				

== Sources ==
Official results of French elections from 2002: "Résultats électoraux officiels en France" (in French).
