= Arrondissement of Paris =

Arrondissement of France in the Île-de-France region

Paris
- Arrondissement
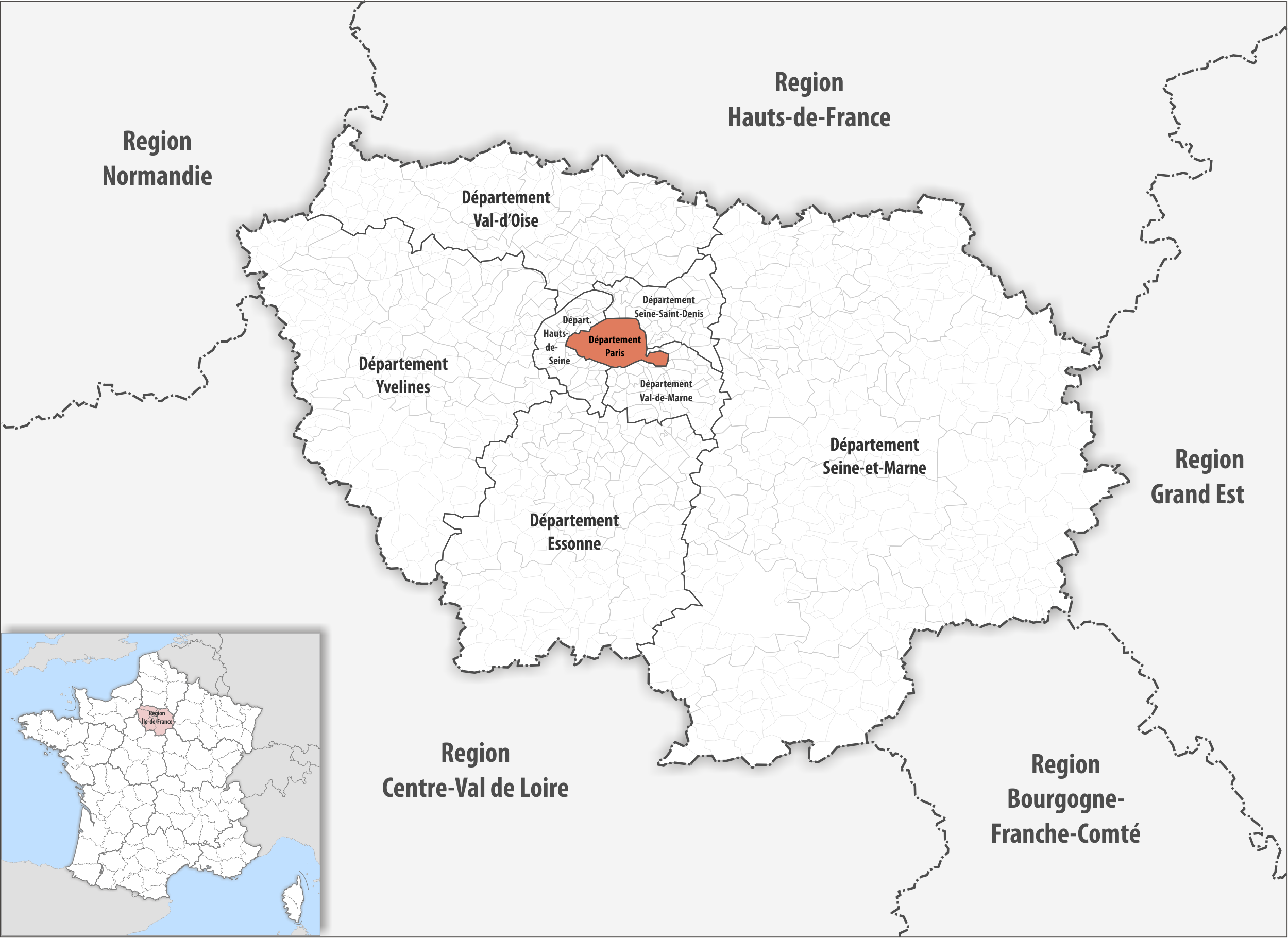
- Location within the Île-de-France region
- Coordinates: 48.86°N 2.34°E
- Country: France
- Region: Île-de-France
- Department: Paris
- No. of communes: {{{nbcomm}}}
- Area: 105.4 km^{2} (40.7 sq mi)
- Population (2023): 2,103,778
  - Density: 19,960/km^{2} (51,700/sq mi)
- INSEE code: 751

The arrondissement of Paris (French: Arrondissement de Paris, [aʁɔ̃dismɑ̃ d(ə) paʁi]) is an arrondissement of France in the Île-de-France region. It covers exactly the commune and department of Paris. Its population is 2,133,111 (2021), and its area is 105.4 km^{2} (40.7 sq mi). On 17 August 2020, Marc Guillaume was appointed prefect of Paris, ex officio regional prefect of Île-de-France.

It has one subdivision: the commune of Paris, which itself has 20 subdivisions: the 20 municipal arrondissements of Paris. The sole other department to have a single arrondissement is the Territoire de Belfort, which in 2024 had 101 communes.

The arrondissement of Paris is the most populated of France, ahead of the arrondissement of Lyon, as well as the most densely populated, ahead of the neighbouring arrondissement of Bobigny.

== History ==
In 1800 the arrondissement of Paris was established as part of the Seine department. In 1962 it absorbed the communes of the former arrondissements of Saint-Denis and Sceaux. In 1964 and 1966 it lost territory to the new arrondissements of Bobigny, Créteil, Nanterre, Antony and Nogent-sur-Marne. In 1968 the Seine department was disbanded, and the arrondissement of Paris became the single arrondissement of the Paris department.
