= Tarn-et-Garonne =

Department of France

Tarn-et-Garonne Tarn e Garona (Occitan)
- Department
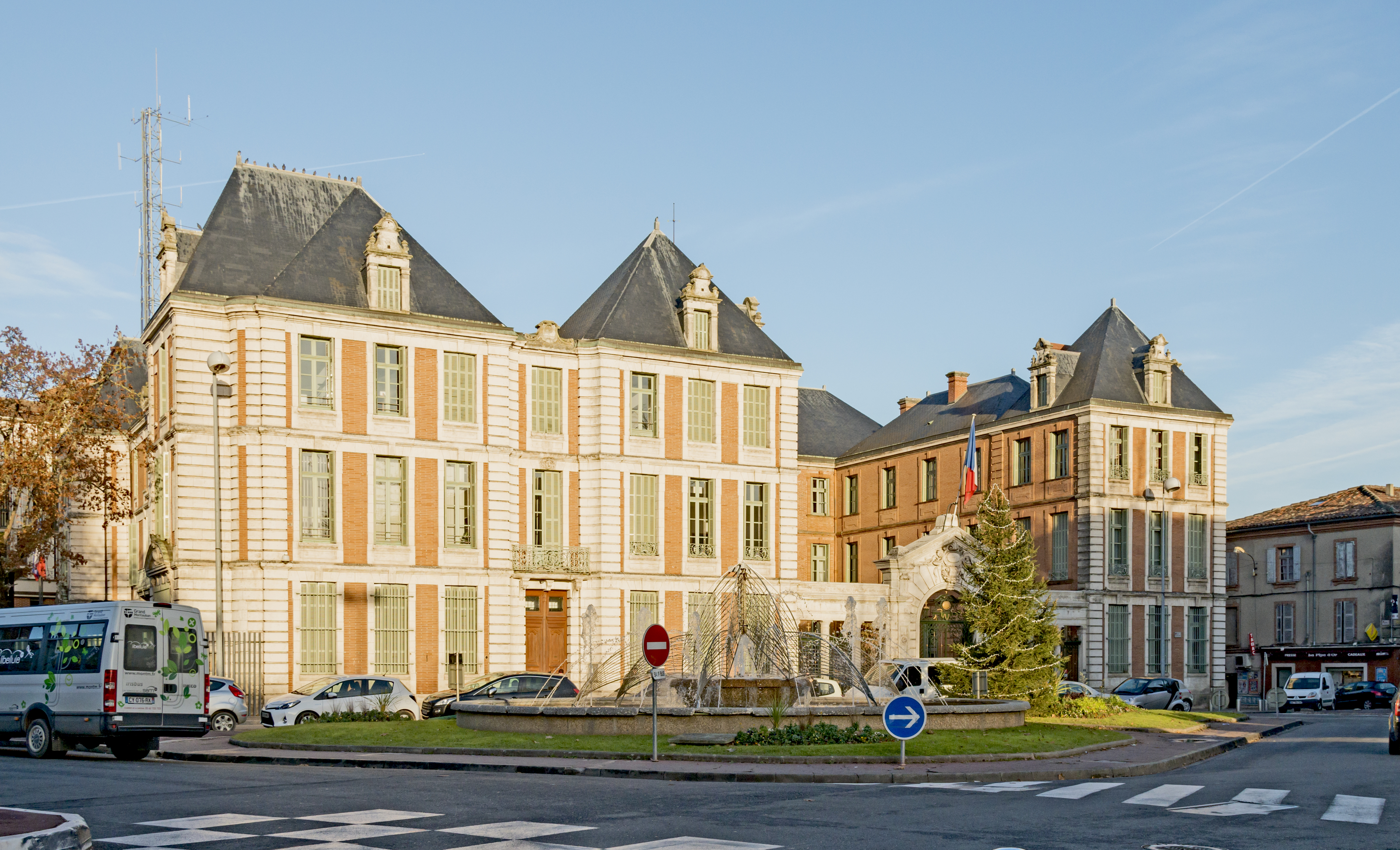
- Prefecture building in Montauban

- Flag Coat of arms

- Location of Tarn-et-Garonne in France
- Coordinates: 44°0′N 1°20′E
- Country: France
- Region: Occitanie
- Prefecture: Montauban
- Subprefectures: Castelsarrasin

Government
  - President of the Departmental Council: Michel Weill (PRG)

Area^{1}
  - Total: 3,718 km^{2} (1,436 sq mi)

Population (2023)
  - Total: 265,817
  - Rank: 82nd
  - Density: 71.49/km^{2} (185.2/sq mi)
- Time zone: UTC+1 (CET)
  - Summer (DST): UTC+2 (CEST)
- ISO 3166 code: FR-82
- Department number: 82
- Arrondissements: 2
- Cantons: 15
- Communes: 195
- ^1 French Land Register data, which exclude estuaries and lakes, ponds and glaciers larger than 1 km^{2}

Tarn-et-Garonne (French: [taʁn e ɡaʁɔn]; Occitan: Tarn e Garona [ˈtaɾ e ɣaˈɾunɔ]; lit. 'Tarn and Garonne') is a department in the Occitania region in Southern France. It is traversed by the rivers Tarn and Garonne, from which it takes its name. The area was originally part of the former provinces of Quercy and Languedoc. The department was created in 1808 under Napoleon, with territory taken from the neighbouring Lot, Haute-Garonne, Lot-et-Garonne, Gers and Aveyron departments.

The department is mostly rural with fertile agricultural land in the broad river valley, but there are hilly areas to the south, east and north. The departmental prefecture is Montauban; the sole subprefecture is Castelsarrasin. In 2023, it had a population of 265,817.

== History ==
=== History of the region ===
Quercy was part of Aquitania prima under the Romans; Christianity was introduced during the 4th century. Early in the 6th century the area fell under the authority of the Franks, and in the 7th century became part of the autonomous Duchy of Aquitaine. At the end of the 10th century, its rulers were the powerful counts of Toulouse. During the hostilities between England and France in the reign of Henry II of England, the English placed garrisons in the county, and by the 1259 Treaty of Paris lower Quercy came under the control of England.

The kings of both England and France around this time tried to curry favour by adding to the privileges of the towns and the district. In 1360, the Treaty of Brétigny was signed and the whole of Quercy passed to England. However, in the 1440s the English were finally expelled by the newly created army of Charles VII of France. In the 16th century Quercy was a stronghold of the Protestants, and the scene of fierce religious conflicts. The civil wars of the reign of Louis XIII largely took place around Montauban.

After Napoleon's defeat in 1815, the monarchy was re-established in France, but the discredited Bourbon Dynasty was overthrown in the July Revolution of 1830, which established the constitutional July Monarchy, which lasted until 1848. During this time the divide between the rich and poor increased; in Montauban, hundreds turned to begging as wages fell, factories closed and food prices rose; rioting was widespread and the home of the mayor was stoned by building workers in 1847.

=== History of the department ===
Map of the region before the creation of the department

Before the department's formation in the nineteenth century, the northern half formed part of the old province of Quercy and the southern half, part of Languedoc. The department was created on 4 November 1808 during the First French Empire by a decision of Napoleon. The emperor had been invited to visit the town of Montauban, an important industrial and commercial centre at the time, whose populace thought the town was central enough and sufficiently important to be the capital of a new department. He was impressed by their loyalty and granted their request.

The department was formed out of territories that had previously been part of neighbouring areas. More than half of the territory was taken from the Department of Lot (including Montauban and Moissac), over one-third was taken from Haute-Garonne (including Castelsarrasin), and the rest from the departments of Lot-et-Garonne, Gers, and Aveyron. The first prefect was Félix Le Peletier d'Aunay, who was installed in his post on 31 December 1808.

== Geography ==
Map of Tarn-et-Garonne

Tarn-et-Garonne constitutes part of the Occitanie region in Southern France. It borders on the departments of Lot to the north, Aveyron to the northeast, Tarn to the east, Haute-Garonne to the south, and Gers and Lot-et-Garonne to the west. The capital of the department is Montauban which lies about 50 km (31 mi) north of Toulouse. Montauban is situated on the right bank of the river Tarn at its confluence with the river Tescou, and the Tarn is joined by the Aveyron about 10 km (6.2 mi) further downstream. The second largest commune in the department is Castelsarrasin which stands near the confluence of the rivers Tarn and Garonne. Montauban is connected to the Garonne via the 11 km (7 mi) Canal de Montech.

The central part of the department is a broad river valley that does not exceed 150 m (492 ft) in altitude, but near the commune of Valence-d'Agen, in the extreme west of the department, the valley narrows as the hilly regions of Bas-Quercy to the north and Lomagne to the south draw closer together. In the northeast of the department is higher land in the form of limestone plateaus known as the Causses, part of the Massif Central. The highest point in the department, at 510 m (1,673 ft), is the Pech Maurel, situated in the commune of Castanet.

== Demographics ==
Historical population

Year	Pop.	±% p.a.
1801	228,000	—
1806	228,420	+0.04%
1821	238,143	+0.28%
1831	242,250	+0.17%
1841	239,297	−0.12%
1851	237,553	−0.07%
1861	232,551	−0.21%
1872	221,610	−0.44%
1881	217,056	−0.23%
1891	206,596	−0.49%
1901	195,669	−0.54%
1911	182,537	−0.69%
1921	159,559	−1.34%
1931	164,259	+0.29%

Year	Pop.	±% p.a.
1936	164,629	+0.05%
1946	167,664	+0.18%
1954	172,379	+0.35%
1962	175,847	+0.25%
1968	183,572	+0.72%
1975	183,314	−0.02%
1982	190,485	+0.55%
1990	200,220	+0.62%
1999	206,034	+0.32%
2007	231,763	+1.48%
2012	246,971	+1.28%
2017	258,349	+0.90%
2023	265,817	+0.48%

=== Principal towns ===
The most populous commune is Montauban, the prefecture. As of 2023, there are seven communes with more than 5,000 inhabitants:

Commune	Population (2023)
Montauban	62,945
Castelsarrasin	14,343
Moissac	13,419
Caussade	6,803
Montech	6,663
Nègrepelisse	5,917
Valence	5,289

== Politics ==
=== Departmental Council of Tarn-et-Garonne ===
The Departmental Council of Tarn-et-Garonne has 30 seats. The president of the Departmental Council is Michel Weill, elected in July 2021.

Composition of the Departmental Council since 2021
Political group	Party	Seats	Position
Radicaux et apparentés	PRG	11	Majority
Tarn-et-Garonne en commun	PS	5	Majority
Le Tarn-et-Garonne d'abord	DVC	6	Opposition
Engagés pour le Tarn-et-Garonne	LR	4	Opposition
Non-inscrits	RN (2) - DVG (2)	4	Opposition

=== Members of the National Assembly ===
Tarn-et-Garonne elected the following members of the National Assembly during the 2022 legislative election:

Constituency	Member	Party
Tarn-et-Garonne's 1st constituency	Brigitte Barèges	Union of the Right for the Republic
Tarn-et-Garonne's 2nd constituency	Marine Hamelet	National Rally

== Gallery ==
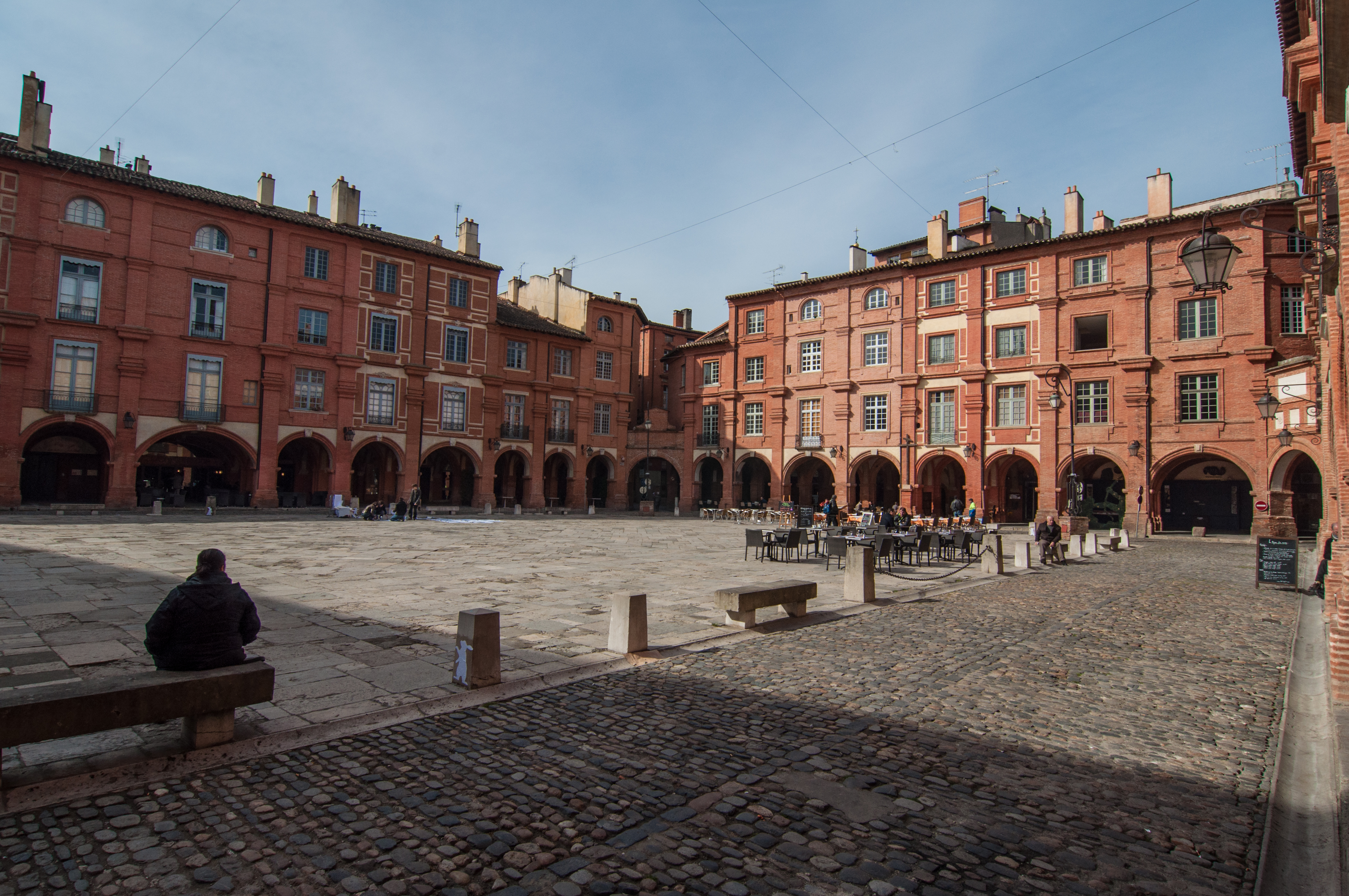
National square in Montauban

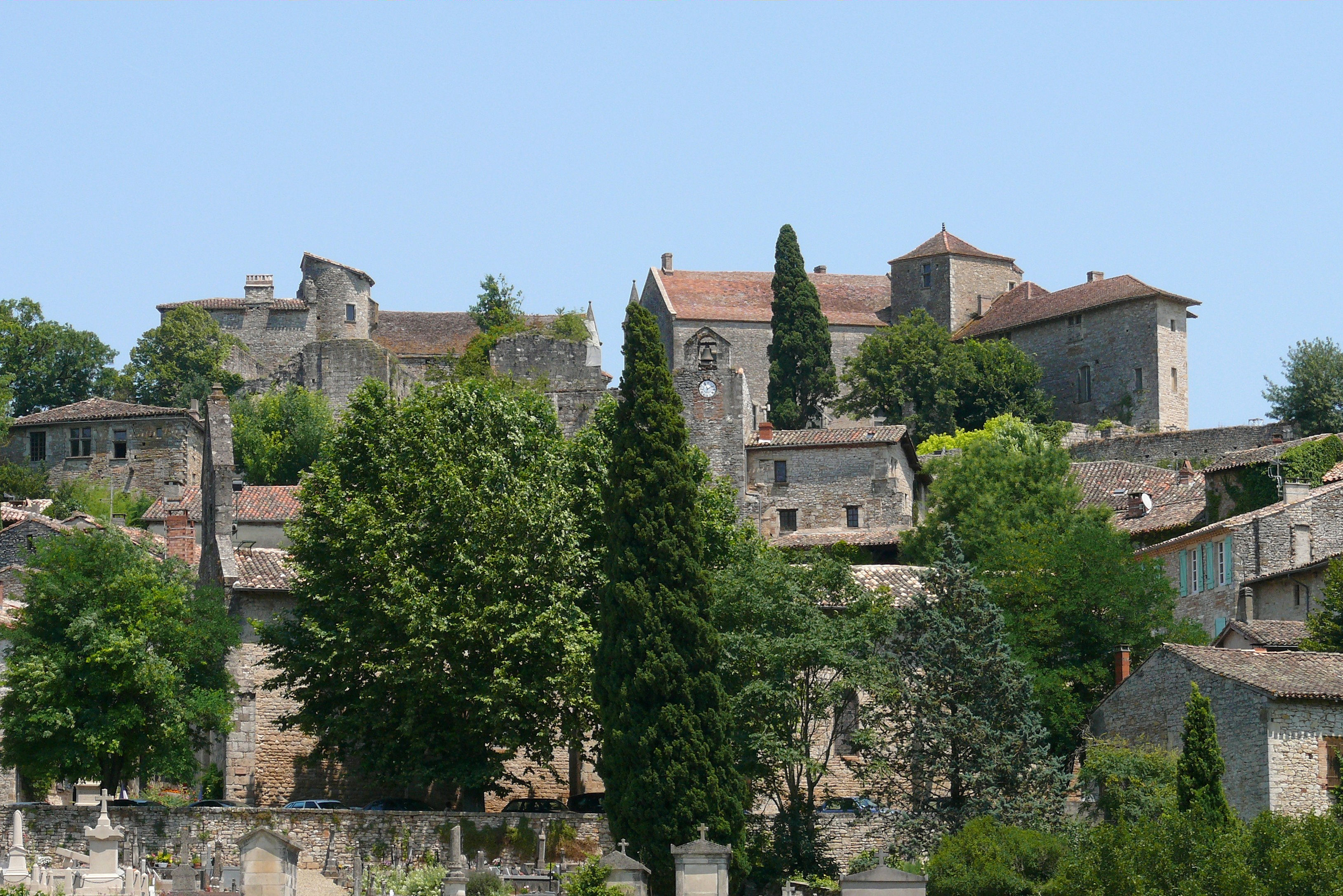
Bruniquel, one of the formally listed "Most Beautiful Villages of France"

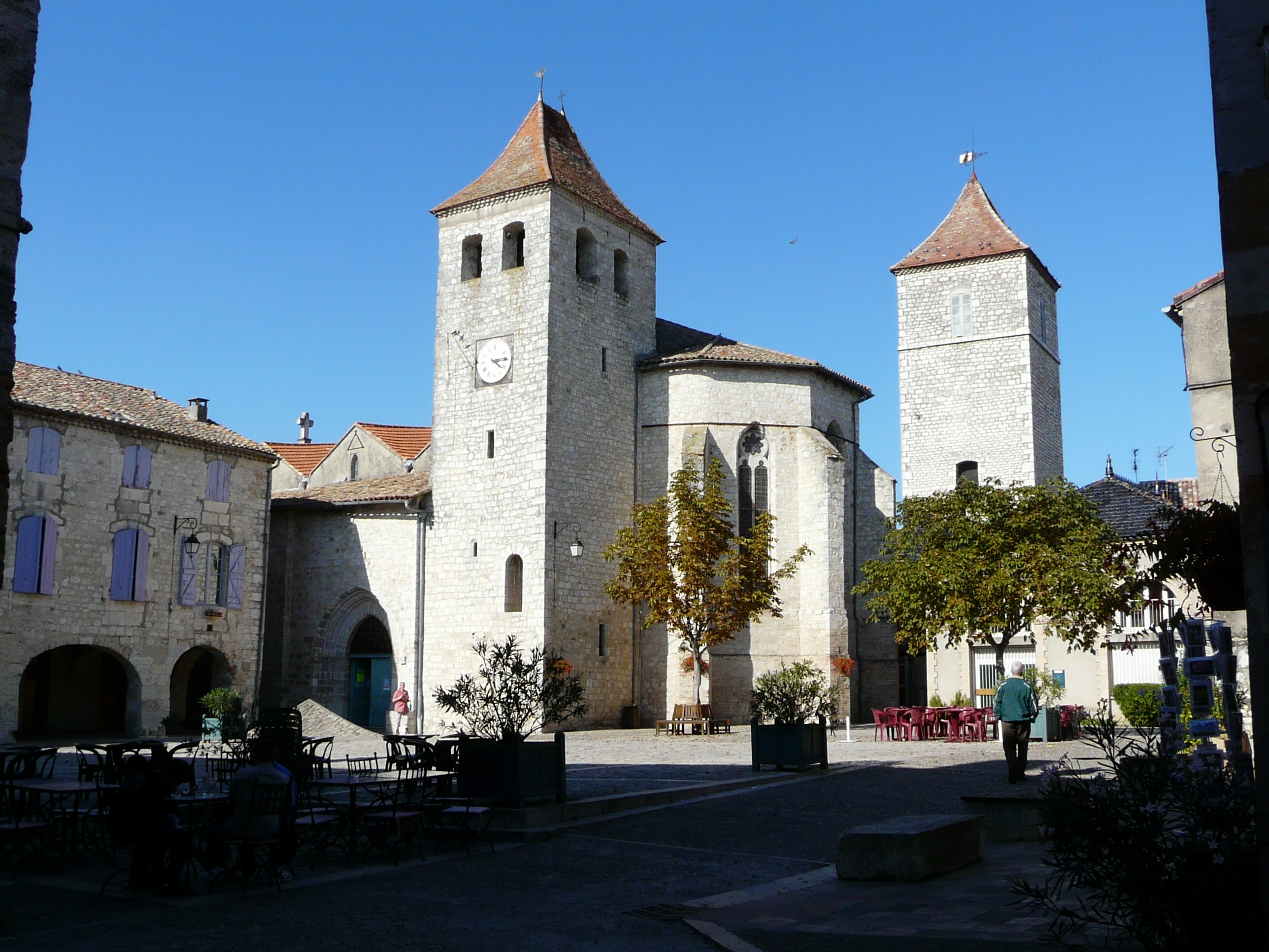
Saint Barthelemy church in Lauzerte

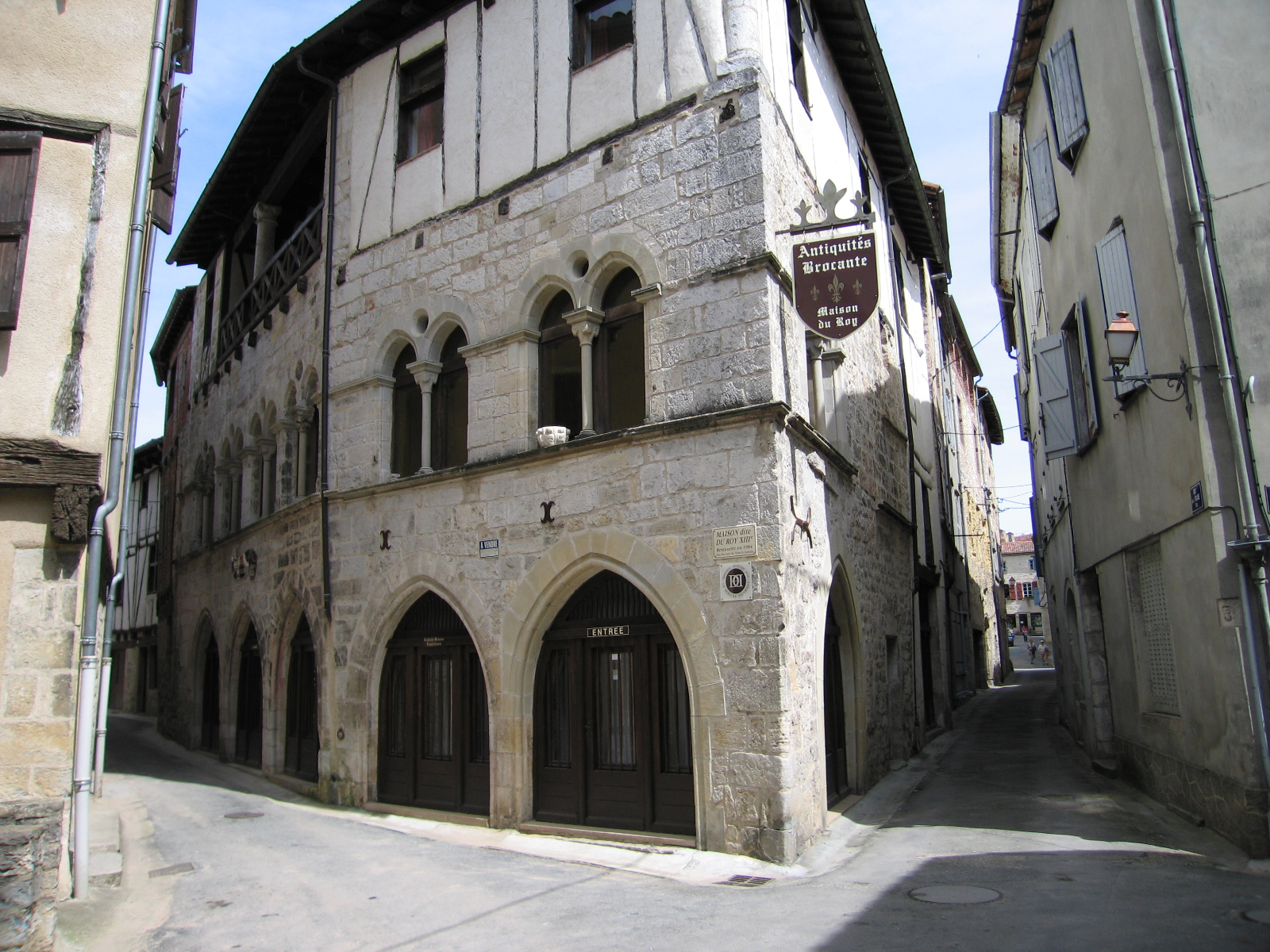
The "King's House" in Saint-Antonin-Noble-Val

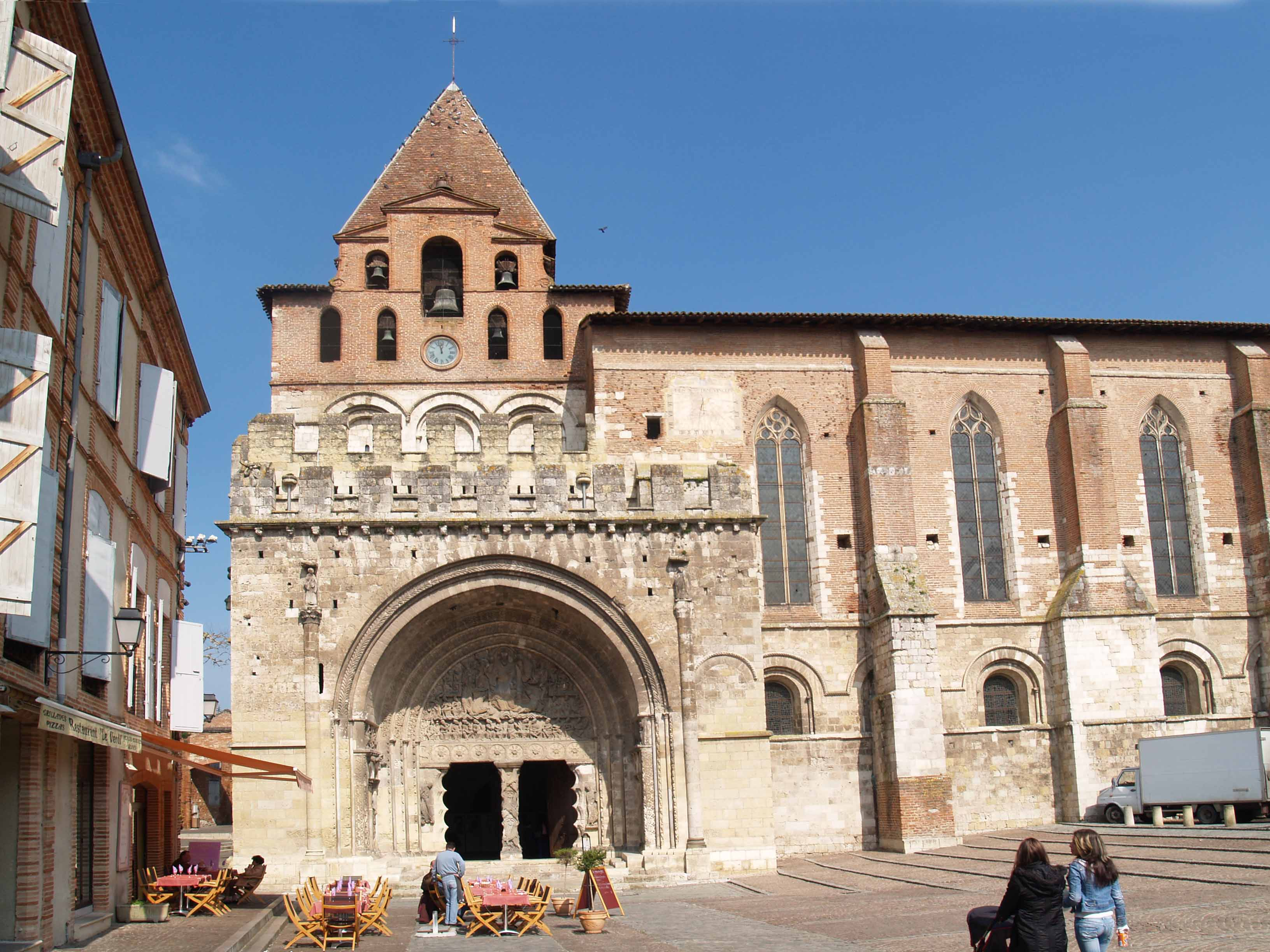
Saint Peter abbey in Moissac

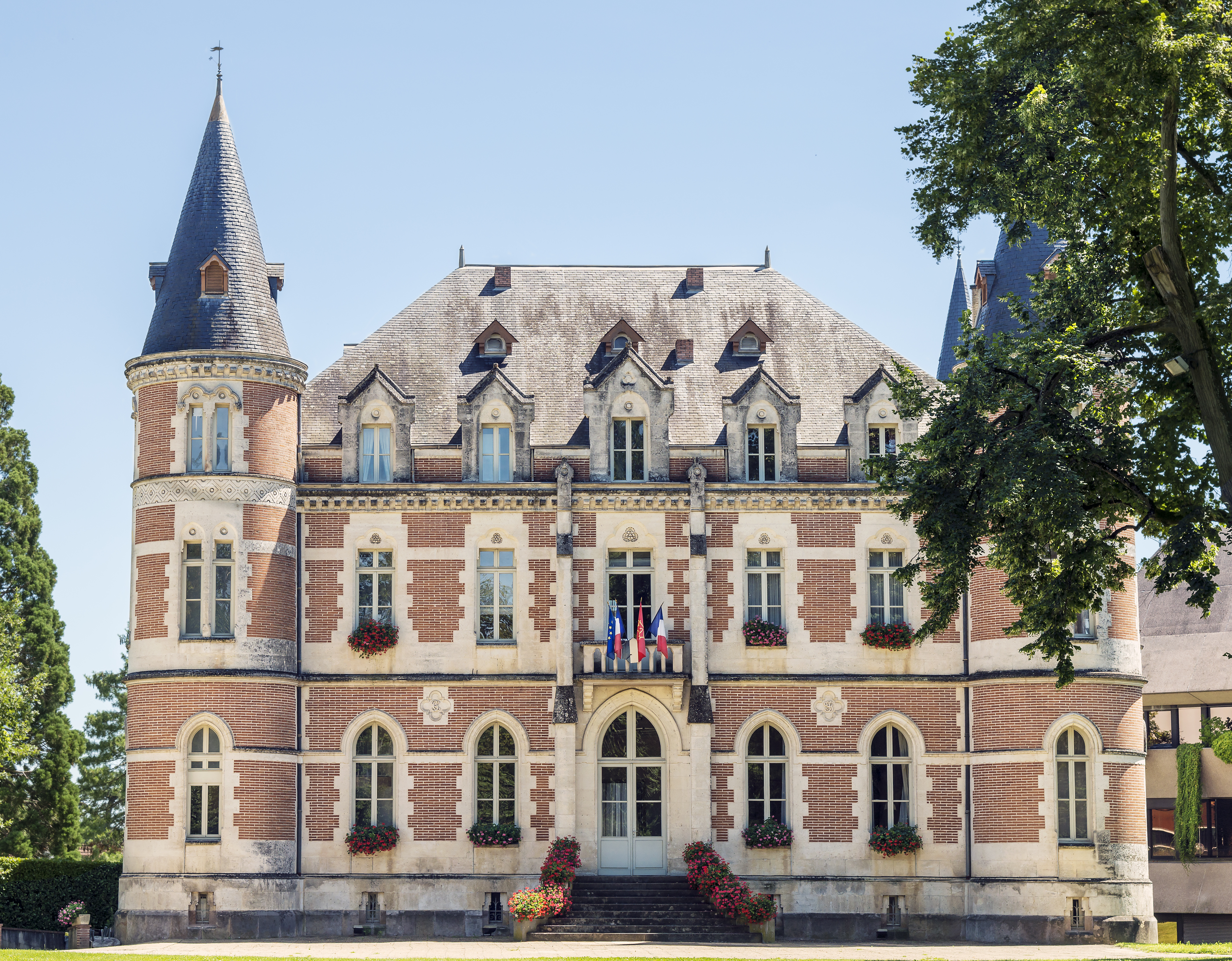
Château de Montauriol, seat of the Departmental Council of Tarn-et-Garonne

== See also ==
- Cantons of the Tarn-et-Garonne department
- Communes of the Tarn-et-Garonne department
- Arrondissements of the Tarn-et-Garonne department
