= Val-de-Marne =

Department of France in Île-de-France

- Department of France
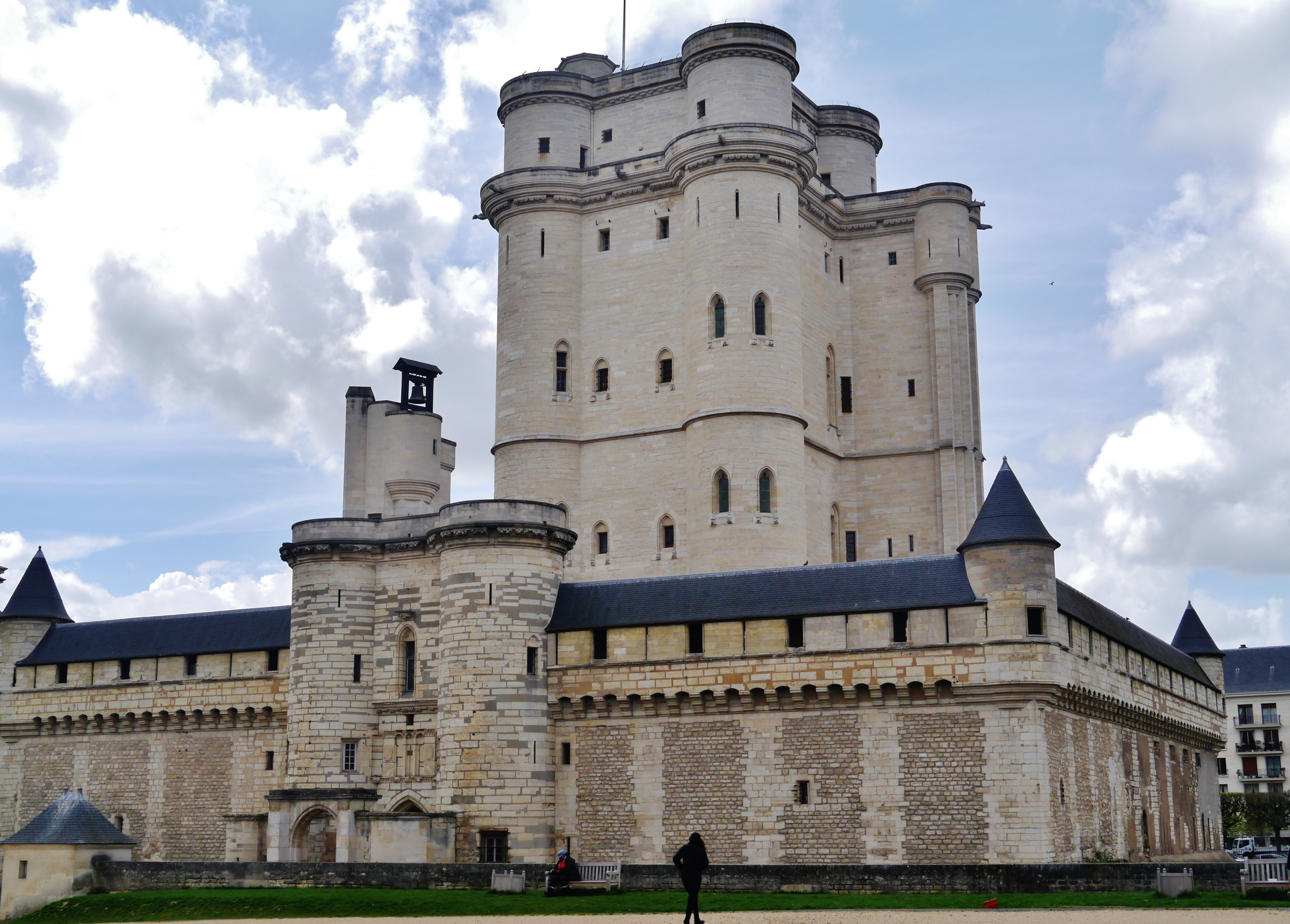
- Château de Vincennes

- Flag Coat of arms

- Location of Val-de-Marne in France
- Coordinates: 48°45′N 2°25′E
- Country: France
- Region: Île-de-France
- Prefecture: Créteil
- Subprefectures: L'Haÿ-les-Roses; Nogent-sur-Marne

Government
  - President of the Departmental Council: Olivier Capitanio (LR)

Area^{1}
  - Total: 245 km^{2} (95 sq mi)

Population (2023)
  - Total: 1,426,929
  - Rank: 12th
  - Density: 5,820/km^{2} (15,100/sq mi)

GDP
  - Total: €56.818 billion (2021)
  - Per capita: €40,144 (2021)
- Time zone: UTC+1 (CET)
  - Summer (DST): UTC+2 (CEST)
- Department number: 94
- Arrondissements: 3
- Cantons: 25
- Communes: 47
- ^1 French Land Register data, which exclude estuaries and lakes, ponds and glaciers larger than 1 km^{2}

Val-de-Marne (French pronunciation: [val də maʁn]; lit. 'Vale of Marne') is a department of France located in the Île-de-France region. Named after the river Marne, it is situated in the Grand Paris metropolis to the southeast of Paris’ city centre. In 2023, Val-de-Marne had a population of 1,426,929.

Its INSEE and postcode number is 94.

== Geography ==
Val-de-Marne is, together with Seine-Saint-Denis and Hauts-de-Seine, one of three small departments in Île-de-France that form a ring around Paris, known as the Petite Couronne ("inner ring"). Since 1 January 2016, Val-de-Marne is included in the Métropole du Grand Paris.

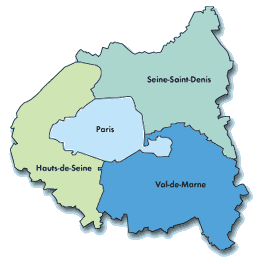

=== Principal towns ===
The most populous commune is Vitry-sur-Seine; the prefecture Créteil is the second-most populous. As of 2023, there are 6 communes with more than 60,000 inhabitants:

Commune	Population (2023)
Vitry-sur-Seine	93,963
Créteil	93,397
Champigny-sur-Marne	78,072
Saint-Maur-des-Fossés	76,572
Ivry-sur-Seine	65,064
Villejuif	60,183

== Administration ==
Val-de-Marne is made up of 3 departmental arrondissements and 47 communes:

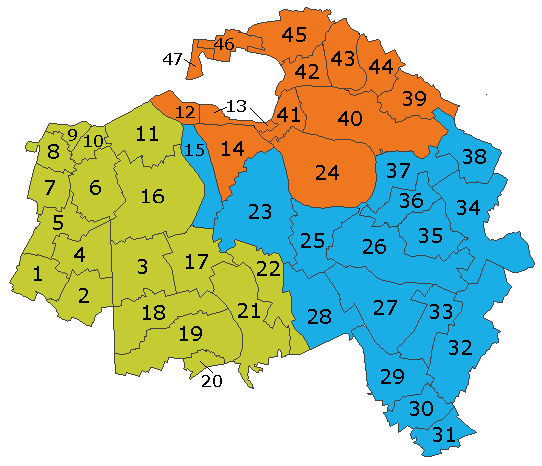

Arrondissement of
L'Haÿ-les-Roses

1. Fresnes
2. Rungis
3. Thiais
4. Chevilly-Larue
5. L'Haÿ-les-Roses
6. Villejuif
7. Cachan
8. Arcueil
9. Gentilly
10. Le Kremlin-Bicêtre
11. Ivry-sur-Seine
16. Vitry-sur-Seine
17. Choisy-le-Roi
18. Orly
19. Villeneuve-le-Roi
20. Ablon-sur-Seine
21. Villeneuve-Saint-Georges
22. Valenton

Arrondissement of
Créteil

15. Alfortville
23. Créteil
25. Bonneuil-sur-Marne
26. Sucy-en-Brie
27. Boissy-Saint-Léger
28. Limeil-Brévannes
29. Villecresnes
30. Mandres-les-Roses
31. Périgny
32. Santeny
33. Marolles-en-Brie
34. La Queue-en-Brie
35. Noiseau
36. Ormesson-sur-Marne
37. Chennevières-sur-Marne
38. Le Plessis-Trévise

Arrondissement of
Nogent-sur-Marne

12. Charenton-le-Pont
13. Saint-Maurice
14. Maisons-Alfort
24. Saint-Maur-des-Fossés
39. Villiers-sur-Marne
40. Champigny-sur-Marne
41. Joinville-le-Pont
42. Nogent-sur-Marne
43. Le Perreux-sur-Marne
44. Bry-sur-Marne
45. Fontenay-sous-Bois
46. Vincennes
47. Saint-Mandé

== History ==
Val-de-Marne was created in January 1968, through the implementation of a law passed in July 1964. Positioned to the south-east of the Paris ring road (and the line of the old city walls), it was formed from the southern-eastern part of the (previously much larger) Seine department, together with a small portion taken from the broken-up department of Seine-et-Oise.

== Demographics ==
Population development since 1881:

Historical population

Year	Pop.	±% p.a.
1881	161,607	—
1891	213,706	+2.83%
1901	288,879	+3.06%
1911	386,073	+2.94%
1921	462,200	+1.82%
1931	657,322	+3.58%
1936	685,295	+0.84%
1946	672,024	−0.20%
1954	767,729	+1.68%
1962	974,962	+3.03%

Year	Pop.	±% p.a.
1968	1,121,319	+2.36%
1975	1,215,713	+1.16%
1982	1,193,655	−0.26%
1990	1,215,538	+0.23%
1999	1,227,250	+0.11%
2007	1,302,889	+0.75%
2012	1,341,831	+0.59%
2017	1,387,926	+0.68%
2023	1,426,929	+0.46%

=== Place of birth of residents ===
Place of birth of residents of Val-de-Marne in 1999
Born in metropolitan France	Born outside metropolitan France			
79.3%	20.7%			
79.3%	Born in overseas France	Born in foreign countries with French citizenship at birth^{1}	EU-15 immigrants^{2}	Non-EU-15 immigrants
79.3%	2.1%	3.3%	4.8%	10.5%
^{1} This group is made up largely of former French settlers, such as pieds-noirs in Northwest Africa, followed by former colonial citizens who had French citizenship at birth (such as was often the case for the native elite in French colonies), as well as to a lesser extent foreign-born children of French expatriates. A foreign country is understood as a country not part of France in 1999, so a person born for example in 1950 in Algeria, when Algeria was an integral part of France, is nonetheless listed as a person born in a foreign country in French statistics.^{2} An immigrant is a person born in a foreign country not having French citizenship at birth. An immigrant may have acquired French citizenship since moving to France, but is still considered an immigrant in French statistics. On the other hand, persons born in France with foreign citizenship (the children of immigrants) are not listed as immigrants.

== Politics ==
The president of the Departmental Council is Olivier Capitanio, elected in July 2021.

=== Presidential elections 2nd round ===
Election	Winning candidate	Party	%	2nd place candidate	Party	%
2022	Emmanuel Macron	LREM	74.48	Marine Le Pen	FN	25.52
2017	Emmanuel Macron	LREM	80.32	Marine Le Pen	FN	19.68
2012	François Hollande	PS	56.48	Nicolas Sarkozy	UMP	43.52
2007	Ségolène Royal	PS	50.20	Nicolas Sarkozy	UMP	49.80
2002	Jacques Chirac	RPR	86.22	Jean-Marie Le Pen	FN	13.78
1995	Jacques Chirac	RPR	52.99	Lionel Jospin	PS	47.01

=== Current National Assembly Representatives ===
Constituency	Member	Party
Val-de-Marne's 1st constituency	Sylvain Berrios	The Republicans
Val-de-Marne's 2nd constituency	Clémence Guetté	La France Insoumise
Val-de-Marne's 3rd constituency	Louis Boyard	La France Insoumise
Val-de-Marne's 4th constituency	Maud Petit	MoDem
Val-de-Marne's 5th constituency	Mathieu Lefèvre	Renaissance
Val-de-Marne's 6th constituency	Guillaume Gouffier-Cha	Renaissance
Val-de-Marne's 7th constituency	Vincent Jeanbrun	The Republicans
Val-de-Marne's 8th constituency	Michel Herbillon	The Republicans
Val-de-Marne's 9th constituency	Isabelle Santiago	Socialist Party
Val-de-Marne's 10th constituency	Mathilde Panot	La France Insoumise
Val-de-Marne's 11th constituency	Sophie Taillé-Polian	Génération.s

== Tourism ==
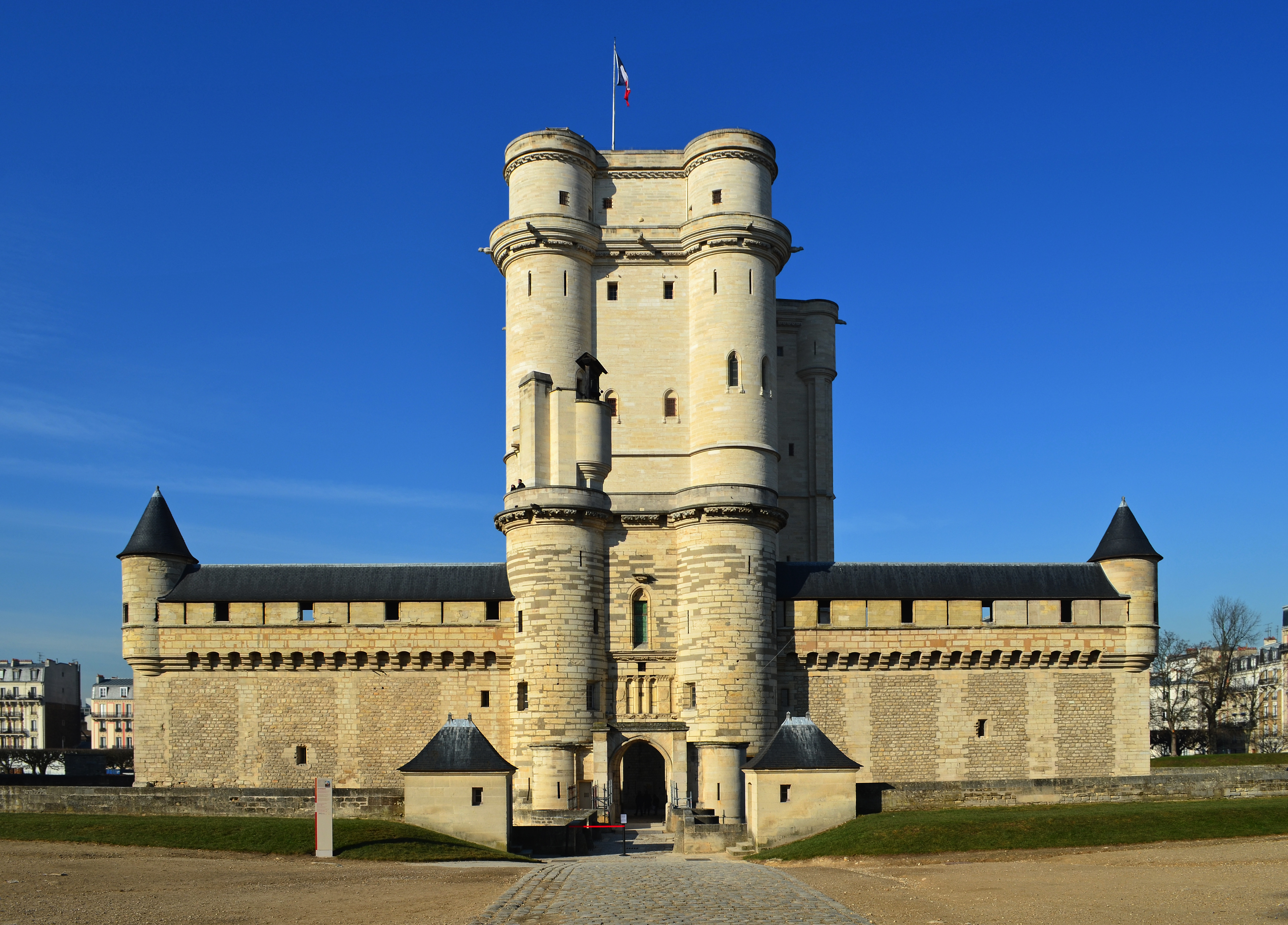
Château de Vincennes

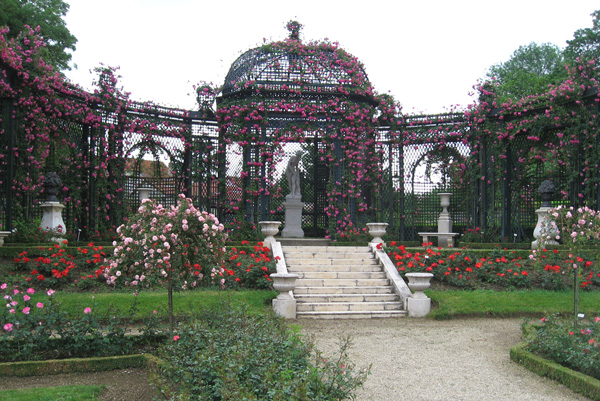
Roseraie de L'Haÿ

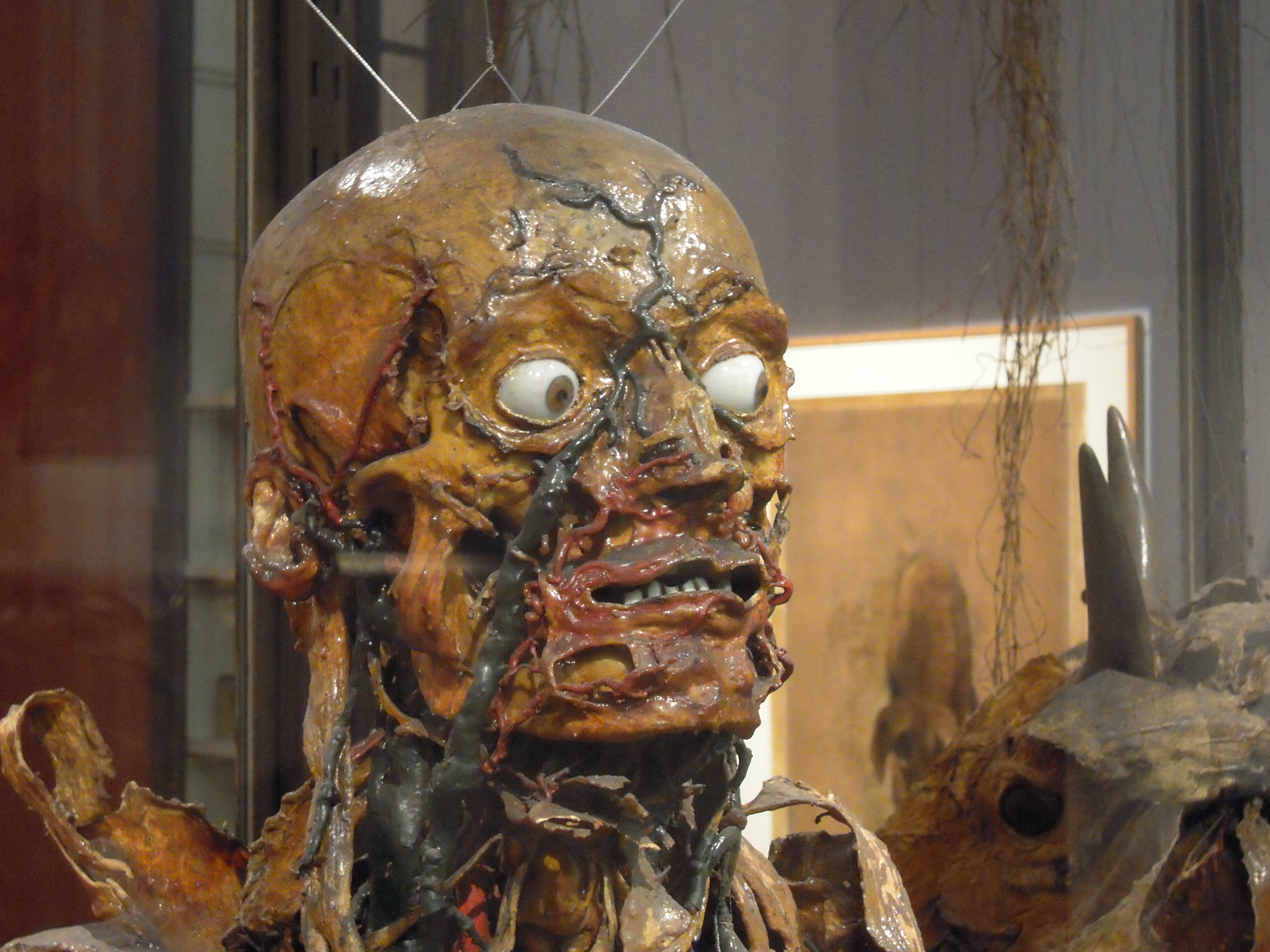
An oddity from the Musée Fragonard d'Alfort

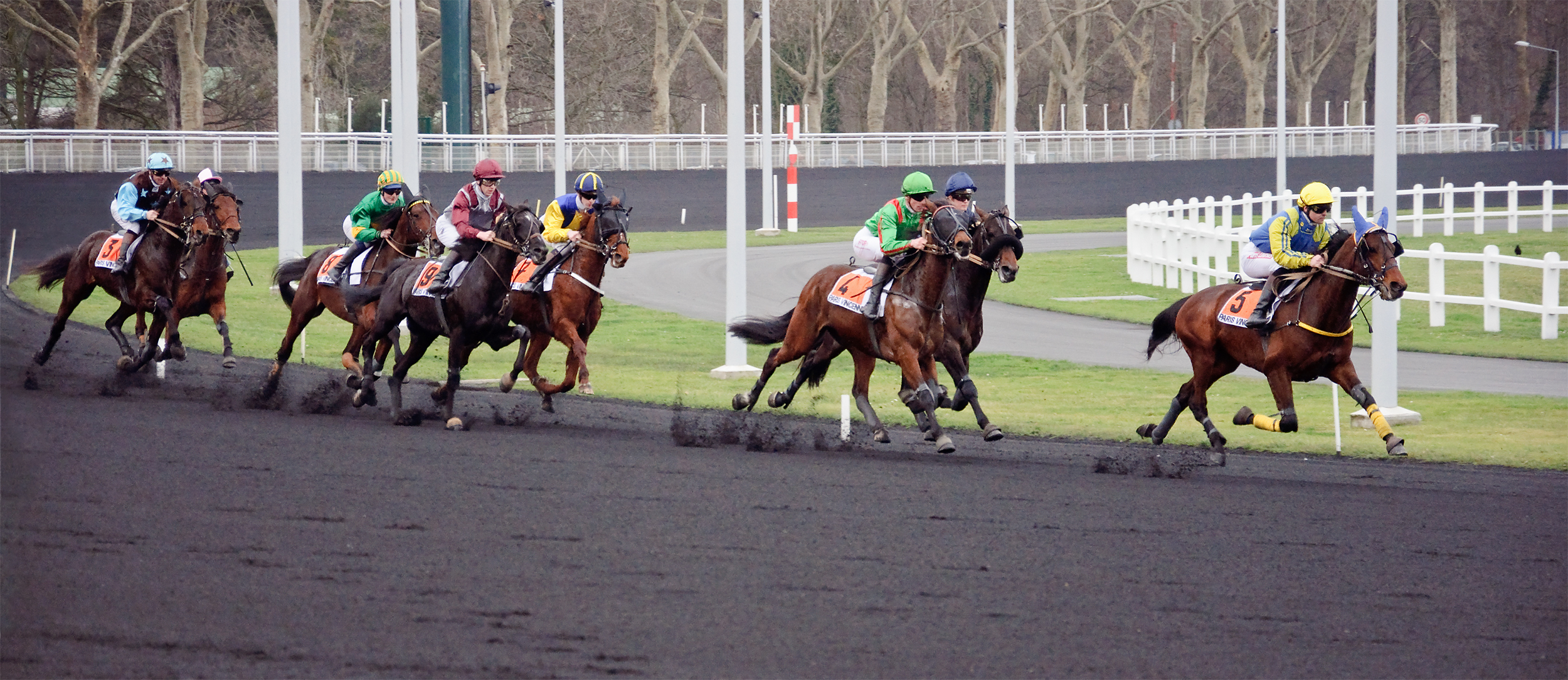
Vincennes Racecourse

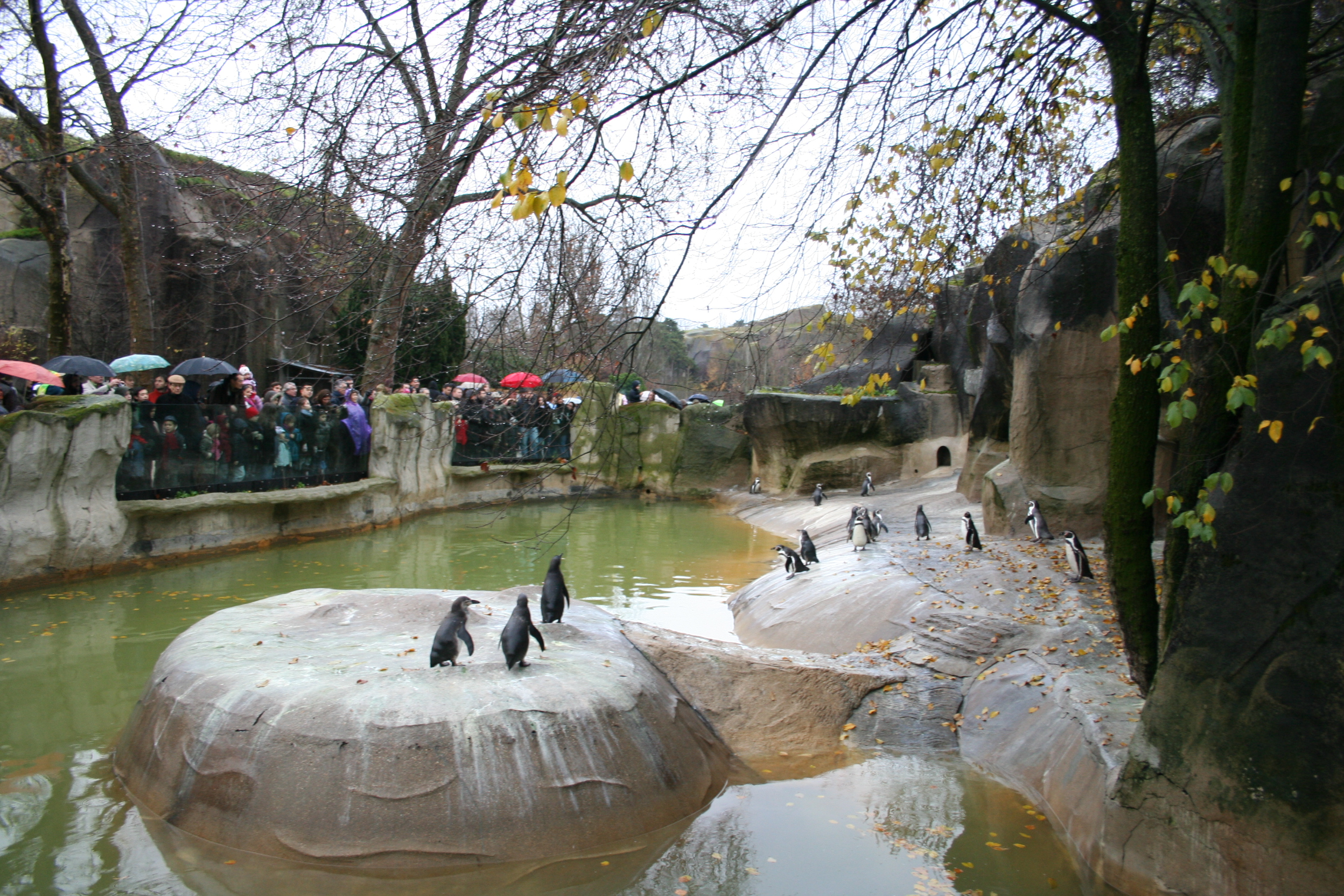
Paris Zoological Park (formerly Vincennes Zoo)

== See also ==
- Communes of the Val-de-Marne department
- Church of Saint-Cyr-Sainte-Julitte, Villejuif
- Charenton Metro-Viaduct
