= Arrondissements of France =

Territorial subdivisions of France

An arrondissement (English: /əˈrɒndɪsmənt/, French: [aʁɔ̃dismɑ̃]) is the third level of administrative division in France generally corresponding to the territory overseen by a subprefect. As of 2023, the 101 French departments are divided into 333 arrondissements (including 13 overseas).

The capital of an arrondissement is called a subprefecture. When an arrondissement contains the prefecture (capital) of the department, that prefecture is the capital of the arrondissement, acting both as a prefecture and as a subprefecture. Arrondissements are further divided into communes.

The term arrondissement can be roughly translated into English as district.

Some municipalities in Quebec are divided into arrondissements, reflecting the province's historical link to New France.

== Role and administration ==
The administration of an arrondissement is assigned to a subprefect (French: sous-préfet) who assists the departmental prefect (préfet).

Unlike French regions, departments and communes, arrondissements do not have the status of legal entity in public law. In addition, unlike those other administrative divisions, they are not run by elected officials, but by political appointees, officials appointed by the French president.

== History ==
The concept of arrondissements was proposed several times as an administrative reform during the Ancien Régime, notably by the intendant of the généralité of Brittany, Gaspard Louis de Caze de La Bove, in his Mémoire concernant les subdélégués de l'intendance de Bretagne (1775).

An equivalent division between departments and communes, the district (district), had been created in 1789 at the start of the French Revolution, but abolished in 1795 by the Directory and replaced with smaller canton-level municipal governments covering several communes.

They were recreated by the Consulate, which was also restoring the position of communes: article 1 of the Constitution of the Year VIII (1799) provided for the division of the territory in departments and arrondissements communaux, both quickly organised by the Law of 28 Pluviôse Year VIII (17 February 1800).

In certain periods in French history, arrondissements have used in legislative elections, especially during the Third Republic. In 1926, 106 of them were abolished, the Poincaré–Sarraut reform. While it claimed it was to achieve fiscal savings, some political analysts considered the results electoral manipulation. Some of these suppressed arrondissements were restored in 1942.

=== Defunct local government ===
Until 1940, arrondissements had a council (conseil d'arrondissement), a deliberative assembly placed alongside the subprefect. Its members (conseillers d'arrondissement) were originally appointed by the central government, then elected from 1833, in the same election as the department's general councils (by half every three years at the time). It was originally expected to represent local interests, especially in the distribution of public funds, and to act as a check on the sub-prefect, but remained consultative and, despite receiving some legal powers in the early years, was never granted legal personhood, unlike departments and communes; the legal execution of its decision fell on the general councils.

This left arrondissement councils little-known and long criticised as useless, and repeated proposals to abolish them were made over a century. They disappeared in 1940, actually suspended, alongside other councils, by the law of 12 October issued by the government of Vichy France, but not revived in 1945, leaving them to disappear for good by desuetude.

=== Changes ===
The most recent creations and disestablishments of arrondissements are listed in the table below.

Year	Department	Created arrondissement(s)	Disbanded arrondissement(s)
2015	Moselle	Forbach-Boulay-Moselle	Forbach, Boulay-Moselle
2015	Moselle	Metz	Metz-Campagne, Metz-Ville
2015	Moselle	Sarrebourg-Château-Salins	Château-Salins, Sarrebourg
2015	Moselle	Thionville	Thionville-Est, Thionville-Ouest
2015	Bas-Rhin	Haguenau-Wissembourg	Haguenau, Wissembourg
2015	Bas-Rhin	Strasbourg	Strasbourg-Campagne, Strasbourg-Ville
2015	Haut-Rhin	Colmar-Ribeauvillé	Colmar, Ribeauvillé
2015	Haut-Rhin	Thann-Guebwiller	Guebwiller, Thann
2017	Loire-Atlantique	Châteaubriant-Ancenis	Ancenis, Châteaubriant
2017	Marne	–	Sainte-Menehould
2022	Guyane	Saint-Georges	-

== Statistics ==
Most departments have three or four arrondissements. The departments of Paris and of the Territoire de Belfort have only one, while the department of Pas-de-Calais has seven. Mayotte has none.

== See also ==
- Administrative divisions of France
- Arrondissement
- Arrondissements of Paris
- List of arrondissements of France
- Municipal arrondissements of France
