= Results of the 2024 French legislative election in Val-de-Marne =

Following the first round of the 2024 French legislative election on 30 June 2024, runoff elections in each constituency where no candidate received a vote share greater than 50 percent were scheduled for 7 July. Candidates permitted to stand in the runoff elections needed to either come in first or second place in the first round or achieve more than 12.5 percent of the votes of the entire electorate (as opposed to 12.5 percent of the vote share due to low turnout).

== Val-de-Marne ==
=== 1st constituency ===
Candidate	Party or alliance		First round		Second round	
Candidate	Party or alliance		Votes	%	Votes	%
Lyes Louffok	New Popular Front	La France Insoumise	19,974	33.03	21,897	36.63
Sylvain Berrios	Miscellaneous right	The Republicans	16,916	27.97	29,142	48.75
Frédéric Descrozaille	Ensemble	Renaissance	11,232	18.57		
Anne-Gaëlle Sabourin	National Rally		11,100	18.36	8,738	14.62
Ludovic Morel	Reconquête		682	1.13		
Valérie de Pierrepont	Far-left	Lutte Ouvrière	567	0.94		
Hélène Cavat	Far-left	Independent	0	0.00		
Total			60,471	100.00	59,777	100.00
Valid votes			60,471	98.47	59,777	98.55
Invalid votes			276	0.45	258	0.43
Blank votes			665	1.08	622	1.03
Total votes			61,412	100.00	60,657	100.00
Registered voters/turnout			85,940	71.46	85,972	70.55

=== 2nd constituency ===
Candidate	Party or alliance		Votes	%
Clémence Guetté	New Popular Front	La France Insoumise	22,494	55.00
Antoine Ghaye	National Rally		7,153	17.49
Mehmet Ceylan	Ensemble	Renaissance	6,559	16.04
Michel Sasportas	The Republicans		2,103	5.14
Patricia Foffé	Ecologists	Union of Democrats and Independents (Note: Dissident who ran without the support of Ensemble)	1,236	3.02
Sabrina Pruvot	Far-left	Lutte Ouvrière	546	1.34
Gérard Cruzille	Reconquête		514	1.26
Manon Haller	Far-left	Independent	291	0.71
Clémence Boutarin	Far-left	Independent	0	0.00
Total			40,896	100.00
Valid votes			40,896	97.66
Invalid votes			378	0.90
Blank votes			600	1.43
Total votes			41,874	100.00
Registered voters/turnout			65,377	64.05

=== 3rd constituency ===
Candidate	Party or alliance		First round		Second round	
Candidate	Party or alliance		Votes	%	Votes	%
Louis Boyard	New Popular Front	La France Insoumise	19,290	42.17	21,492	46.92
Arnaud Barbotin	Union of the far right	The Republicans	12,491	27.31	13,810	30.15
Loïc Signor	Ensemble	Renaissance	10,871	23.77	10,507	22.94
Géraldine Telle	Miscellaneous centre	Independent	870	1.90		
Lucien Noaile	Far-left	Lutte Ouvrière	651	1.42		
Frédérique Poncet	Reconquête		650	1.42		
Noël Agossa	Miscellaneous centre	The Republicans	602	1.32		
Emmanuelly Gougougnan-Zadigue	Sovereigntist right	Debout la France	315	0.69		
Total			45,740	100.00	45,809	100.00
Valid votes			45,740	96.55	45,809	97.19
Invalid votes			385	0.81	309	0.66
Blank votes			1,249	2.64	1,015	2.15
Total votes			47,374	100.00	47,133	100.00
Registered voters/turnout			74,372	63.70	74,405	63.35

=== 4th constituency ===
Candidate	Party or alliance		First round		Second round	
Candidate	Party or alliance		Votes	%	Votes	%
Adel Amara	New Popular Front	La France Insoumise	16,505	33.02	18,140	36.00
Maud Petit	Ensemble	Democratic Movement	15,287	30.58	18,454	36.63
Alain Philippet	National Rally		13,474	26.95	13,789	27.37
Bernard Chaussegros	Miscellaneous right	Independent	1,292	2.58		
Marie-Odile Perru	Miscellaneous centre	Independent	820	1.64		
Soraya Benslimane	Sovereigntist right	Debout la France	624	1.25		
Michaël Bohbot	Reconquête		594	1.19		
Brigitte Moulin	Far-left	Lutte Ouvrière	557	1.11		
Maxence Sobral	Miscellaneous right	Regionalists	543	1.09		
Jean Dambreville	Miscellaneous left	Independent	293	0.59		
Total			49,989	100.00	50,383	100.00
Valid votes			49,989	97.61	50,383	97.99
Invalid votes			325	0.63	272	0.53
Blank votes			898	1.75	760	1.48
Total votes			51,212	100.00	51,415	100.00
Registered voters/turnout			74,883	68.39	74,910	68.64

=== 5th constituency ===
Candidate	Party or alliance		First round		Second round	
Candidate	Party or alliance		Votes	%	Votes	%
Mathieu Lefevre	Ensemble	Renaissance	23,416	38.52	26,159	43.27
Julien Léger	New Popular Front	Communist Party	22,657	37.27	23,845	39.44
Isabelle Huguenin-Richard	National Rally		12,401	20.40	10,448	17.28
Simone Benouadah	Reconquête		853	1.40		
Catherine Molinari	Miscellaneous centre	Independent	717	1.18		
François Joslin	Far-left	Lutte Ouvrière	563	0.93		
Maeva Sara Angèle	Miscellaneous centre	Independent	179	0.29		
Total			60,786	100.00	60,452	100.00
Valid votes			60,786	97.76	60,452	98.32
Invalid votes			316	0.51	212	0.34
Blank votes			1,075	1.73	821	1.34
Total votes			62,177	100.00	61,485	100.00
Registered voters/turnout			91,674	67.82	91,708	67.04

=== 6th constituency ===
Candidate	Party or alliance		First round		Second round	
Candidate	Party or alliance		Votes	%	Votes	%
May Bouhada	New Popular Front	The Ecologists	24,417	40.63	26,049	47.46
Guillaume Gouffier Valente	Ensemble	Renaissance	22,464	37.38	28,834	52.54
Martina Gabelica	National Rally		8,347	13.89		
Victor Gaonach	Miscellaneous right	Independent	2,325	3.87		
Rémy Longetti	Reconquête		1,099	1.83		
Tony Renault	Miscellaneous centre	Ecologists	979	1.63		
Véronique Hunaut	Far-left	Lutte Ouvrière	290	0.48		
Murielle Morand	Far-left	Independent	176	0.29		
Total			60,097	100.00	54,883	100.00
Valid votes			60,097	98.53	54,883	95.54
Invalid votes			287	0.47	622	1.08
Blank votes			608	1.00	1,941	3.38
Total votes			60,992	100.00	57,446	100.00
Registered voters/turnout			82,431	73.99	82,442	69.68

=== 7th constituency ===
Candidate	Party or alliance		First round		Second round	
Candidate	Party or alliance		Votes	%	Votes	%
Rachel Keke	New Popular Front	La France Insoumise	18,736	43.65	20,088	49.33
Vincent Jeanbrun	The Republicans		14,869	34.64	20,633	50.67
Claude Ledion	National Rally		8,111	18.89		
Claire Maury	Far-left	Lutte Ouvrière	623	1.45		
Florence de la Ruelle	Reconquête		493	1.15		
Rachel Castin	Far-right	Independent	95	0.22		
Total			42,927	100.00	40,721	100.00
Valid votes			42,927	97.74	40,721	96.16
Invalid votes			278	0.63	387	0.91
Blank votes			716	1.63	1,239	2.93
Total votes			43,921	100.00	42,347	100.00
Registered voters/turnout			66,790	65.76	66,811	63.38

=== 8th constituency ===
Candidate	Party or alliance		First round		Second round	
Candidate	Party or alliance		Votes	%	Votes	%
Michel Herbillon	The Republicans		24,722	44.13	30,568	58.44
Joao Martins-Pereira	New Popular Front	Socialist Party	20,658	36.88	21,743	41.56
Raphaël Turpin	National Rally		9,085	16.22		
Olivier Buclin	Reconquête		1,009	1.80		
Amandine Cheyns	Far-left	Lutte Ouvrière	546	0.97		
Total			56,020	100.00	52,311	100.00
Valid votes			56,020	98.66	52,311	97.31
Invalid votes			230	0.41	409	0.76
Blank votes			528	0.93	1,037	1.93
Total votes			56,778	100.00	53,757	100.00
Registered voters/turnout			77,040	73.70	77,020	69.80

=== 9th constituency ===
Candidate	Party or alliance		Votes	%
Isabelle Santiago	New Popular Front	Socialist Party	19,548	58.09
Wenqi Cui	National Rally		6,083	18.08
Noémie Amirou	Ensemble	Radical Party	4,964	14.75
Jérôme Aubertin	The Republicans		1,353	4.02
Christophe Jaubert	Miscellaneous centre	Ecologists	730	2.17
Marie Vieira	Far-left	Lutte Ouvrière	353	1.05
Ambroise Ramassamy	Reconquête		353	1.05
Véronique Ducandas	Far-left	Independent	184	0.55
Sophie Ortole	Far-right	Independent	82	0.24
Luc Chevallier	Far-left	New Anticapitalist Party (Note: Dissident who ran without the support of the New Popular Front)	0	0.00
Total			33,650	100.00
Valid votes			33,650	97.81
Invalid votes			284	0.83
Blank votes			469	1.36
Total votes			34,403	100.00
Registered voters/turnout			54,445	63.19

=== 10th constituency ===
Candidate	Party or alliance		Votes	%
Mathilde Panot	New Popular Front	La France Insoumise	25,536	59.27
Shannon Seban	Ensemble	Renaissance	7,977	18.51
Élise Lin	National Rally		6,408	14.87
Coralie Barberon	Ecologists	Independent	1,788	4.15
Christine Lichtenauer	Far-left	Lutte Ouvrière	491	1.14
Charlotte Sevestre	Reconquête		469	1.09
Selma Labib	Far-left	New Anticapitalist Party (Note: Dissident who ran without the support of the New Popular Front)	212	0.49
Farid Aïssaoui	Independent		204	0.47
Total			43,085	100.00
Valid votes			43,085	97.63
Invalid votes			381	0.86
Blank votes			664	1.50
Total votes			44,130	100.00
Registered voters/turnout			66,628	66.23

=== 11th constituency ===
Candidate	Party or alliance		Votes	%
Sophie Taillé-Polian	New Popular Front	Génération.s	24,447	57.36
Nathalie Picot	Ensemble	Renaissance	8,494	19.93
Sylvie Bouchot	National Rally		6,093	14.30
Coralie Barberon	Miscellaneous right	Independent	1,504	3.53
Charles Mariaud	Union of Democrats and Independents (Note: Dissident who ran without the support of Ensemble)		1,167	2.74
Lydie Cousty	Reconquête		452	1.06
Christine Samson	Far-left	Lutte Ouvrière	319	0.75
Sébastien Sugranes	Far-left	New Anticapitalist Party (Note: Dissident who ran without the support of the New Popular Front)	146	0.34
Total			42,622	100.00
Valid votes			42,622	98.15
Invalid votes			217	0.50
Blank votes			587	1.35
Total votes			43,426	100.00
Registered voters/turnout			66,060	65.74
