= Val-de-Marne's 1st constituency =

Constituency of the National Assembly of France

1st constituency of Val-de-Marne
- inline Constituency of the National Assembly of France

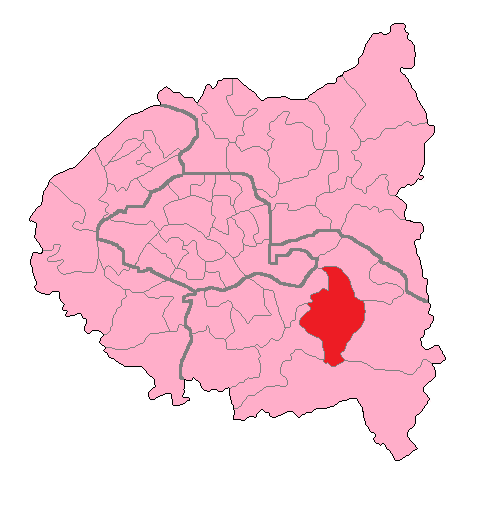
- Val-de-Marne's 1st Constituency shown within Île-de-France
- Deputy: Frédéric Descrozaille; RE
- Department: Val-de-Marne
- Cantons: Bonneuil-sur-Marne - Champigny-sur-Marne-Ouest - Créteil-Nord - Saint-Maur-des-Fossés-Centre - Saint-Maur-des-Fossés-Ouest - Saint-Maur-La Varenne
- Registered voters: 82,696

The 1st constituency of Val-de-Marne is a French legislative constituency in the Val-de-Marne département.

== Description ==
The 1st constituency of Val-de-Marne lies in the centre of the department to the south west of Paris. It includes part of Saint-Maur-des-Fossés and the north of Créteil both of which form part of Paris's suburbs. The constituency is part of the more conservative eastern half of the department.

The result of the 2012 election was overturned by the Constitutional Council leading to a by-election in which the incumbent Henri Plagnol was defeated by Sylvain Berrios standing as a dissident UMP candidate.

== Historic Representation ==
Election	Member	Party
1967	Marie-Claude Vaillant-Couturier	PCF
1968	Marie-Claude Vaillant-Couturier	PCF
1973	Georges Marchais	PCF
1978	Georges Marchais	PCF
1981	Georges Marchais	PCF
1986	Proportional representation – no election by constituency	
1988	Christiane Papon	RPR
1993	Jean-Louis Beaumont	UDF
1997	Henri Plagnol	UDF
2002	Henri Plagnol	UMP
2007	Henri Plagnol	UMP
2012	Henri Plagnol	UMP
2012	Sylvain Berrios	UMP
2017	Frédéric Descrozaille	LREM
2022	Frédéric Descrozaille	RE

== Election results ==
=== 2024 ===
Candidate	Party	Alliance	First round			Second round		
Candidate	Party	Alliance	Votes	%	+/–	Votes	%	+/–
Lyes Louffok	LFI	NFP	19,974	33.03	+5.19	21,897	36.63	-4.28
Sylvain Berrios	LR		16,916	27.97	+8.84	29,142	48.75	n/a
Frédéric Descrozaille	RE	ENS	11,232	18.57	-10.17	WITHDREW		
Anne-Gaëlle Sabourin	RN		11,100	18.36	+9.39	8,738	14.62	n/a
Ludovic Morel	REC		682	1.13	-4.59			
Valérie de Pierrepont	LO		567	0.94	+0.17			
Hélène Cavat	EXG		0	0.00	N/A			
Valid votes			60,471	98.47	+0.09	59,777	98.55	+0.08
Blank votes			665	1.08	-0.07	622	1.03	-0.05
Null votes			276	0.45	-0.02	258	0.43	-0.02
Turnout			61,412	71.46	+20.40	60,657	70.55	-0.91
Abstentions			24,528	28.54	-20.40	25,315	29.45	-0.91
Registered voters			85,940			85,972		
Source: Ministry of the Interior, Le Monde
Result						LR GAIN FROM RE		

=== 2022 ===
Legislative Election 2022: Val-de-Marne's 1st constituency
Party	Candidate	Votes	%	±%
LREM (Ensemble)	Frédéric Descrozaille	12,291	28.74	-10.99
LFI (NUPÉS)	Thierry Guintrand	11,908	27.84	+4.13
LR (UDC)	Germain Roesch	8,183	19.13	−3.86
RN	Laurent Jolly	3,835	8.97	+2.32
REC	Mirela Bratulescu	2,445	5.72	N/A
DVE	Amina Bouatlaoui	1,598	3.74	N/A
DVG	Pierre-Louis Lauzet	1,302	3.04	N/A
Others	N/A	1,209		
Turnout		41,659	48.94	−2.70
2nd round result
LREM (Ensemble)	Frédéric Descrozaille	23,949	59.09	+6.62
LFI (NUPÉS)	Thierry Guintrand	16,581	40.91	N/A
Turnout		40,530	50.55	+7.90
LREM hold				

=== 2017 ===
Legislative Election 2017: Val-de-Marne's 1st constituency
Party	Candidate	Votes	%	±%
LREM	Frédéric Descrozaille	17,119	39.73	N/A
LR	André Kaspi	9,906	22.99	−14.71
LFI	Thierry N'Kaoua	3,857	8.95	N/A
FN	Thierry Devige	2,865	6.65	−2.73
PCF	Denis Oztorun	2,241	5.20	−3.16
PS	Olivier Place	2,225	5.16	−22.70
EELV	Catherine Monié	1,895	4.40	−0.03
DVD	Roméo De Amorim	914	2.12	N/A
Others	N/A	2,067		
Turnout		43,725	51.64	−6.53
2nd round result
LREM	Frédéric Descrozaille	17,114	52.47	N/A
LR	André Kaspi	15,505	47.53	−9.43
Turnout		36,116	42.65	−12.12
LREM gain from LR		Swing		

=== 2012 ===
Legislative Election 2012: Val-de-Marne's 1st constituency
Party	Candidate	Votes	%	±%
UMP	Henri Plagnol	18,137	37.70	−6.70
PS	Akli Mellouli	13,400	27.86	+12.04
FN	Anne-Laure Maleyre	4,510	9.38	+6.08
FG	Micheline Gervelas	4,022	8.36	+1.81
DVD	Pascale Luciani	2,534	5.27	N/A
EELV	Michel Gineste	2,132	4.43	+1.45
MoDem	Marie-Anne Kraft	1,667	3.47	−18.80
Others	N/A	1,701		
Turnout		48,103	58.17	−5.70
2nd round result
UMP	Henri Plagnol	25,800	56.96	+2.73
PS	Akli Mellouli	19,494	43.04	N/A
Turnout		45,294	54.77	−1.89
UMP hold				

=== 2007 ===
Legislative Election 2007: Val-de-Marne's 1st constituency
Party	Candidate	Votes	%	±%
UMP	Henri Plagnol	15,372	44.40	+12.58
MoDem	Jean-Marie Cavada	7,711	22.27	N/A
PS	Akli Mellouli	5,477	15.82	−7.00
PCF	Patrick Douet	2,267	6.55	+2.16
FN	Stéphanie Fontaine	1,143	3.30	−5.12
LV	Bruno Helin	1,033	2.98	+0.29
Others	N/A	1,616		
Turnout		35,046	63.87	−4.35
2nd round result
UMP	Henri Plagnol	15,762	54.23	−7.85
MoDem	Jean-Marie Cavada	13,305	45.77	N/A
Turnout		31,088	56.66	−4.51
UMP hold				

=== 2002 ===
Legislative Election 2002: Val-de-Marne's 1st constituency
Party	Candidate	Votes	%	±%
UMP	Henri Plagnol	10,826	31.82	N/A
PS	Elisabeth Savary	7,763	22.82	+1.89
DVD	Jacques Leroy	4,818	14.16	N/A
UDF	Jean-Bernard Thonus	3,386	9.95	−17.27
FN	Myriam Gille	2,863	8.42	−4.56
PCF	Sylvie Paturey	1,495	4.39	−5.41
LV	Daniele Cornet	914	2.69	N/A
Others	N/A	1,955		
Turnout		34,514	68.22	+0.98
2nd round result
UMP	Henri Plagnol	18,476	62.08	N/A
PS	Elisabeth Savary	11,285	37.92	−3.99
Turnout		30,946	61.17	−9.42
UMP gain from UDF				

=== 1997 ===
Legislative Election 1997: Val-de-Marne's 1st constituency
Party	Candidate	Votes	%	±%
UDF	Henri Plagnol	8,986	27.22	
PS	Michèle Sabban	6,910	20.93	
UDF	Jean-Louis Beaumont*	5,302	16.06	
FN	Thierry Bouzard	4,286	12.98	
PCF	Patrick Douet	3,235	9.80	
GE	Thierry Debas	834	2.53	
MEI	Michel Gineste	804	2.44	
LO	Daniel Gendre	793	2.40	
Others	N/A	1,858		
Turnout		34,243	67.24	
2nd round result
UDF	Henri Plagnol	19,913	58.09	
PS	Michèle Sabban	14,364	41.91	
Turnout		35,954	70.59	
UDF hold				

* UDF dissident

== Sources ==
Official results of French elections from 2002: "Résultats électoraux officiels en France" (in French).
