= Hôtel de Ville, Saint-Maur-des-Fossés =

Town hall in Saint-Maur-des-Fossés, France

Hôtel de Ville
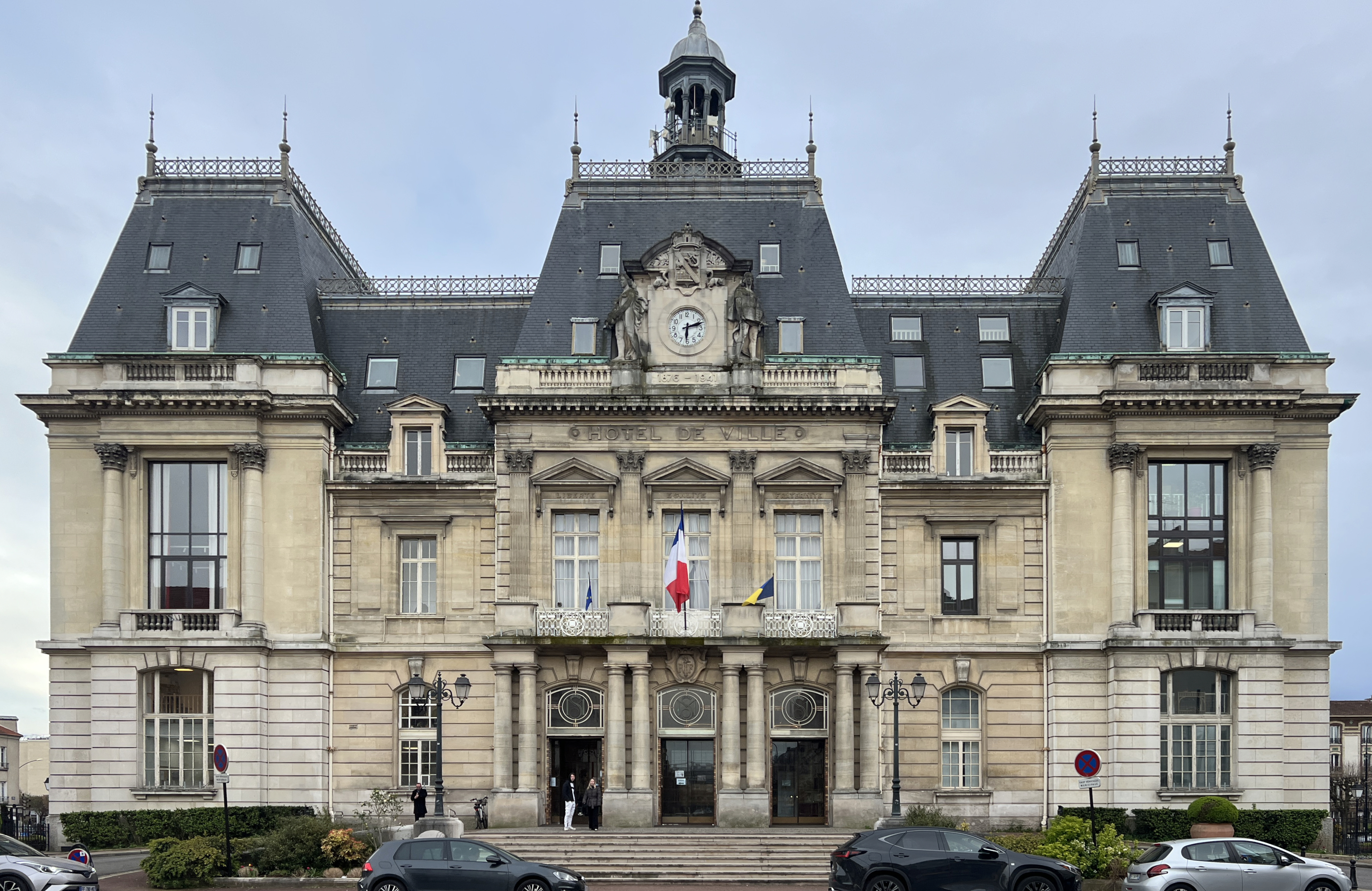
- The main frontage of the Hôtel de Ville in March 2024
- Interactive map of the Hôtel de Ville area

General information
- Type: City hall
- Architectural style: Louis XIII style
- Location: Saint-Maur-des-Fossés, France
- Coordinates: 48.8028°N 2.4853°E
- Completed: 1876

Design and construction
- Architect: Henri Ratouin

The Hôtel de Ville (French pronunciation: [otɛl də vil], City Hall) is a municipal building in Saint-Maur-des-Fossés, Val-de-Marne, France in the southeastern suburbs of Paris standing on Avenue Victor Hugo. It has been included on the Inventaire général des monuments by the French Ministry of Culture since 1986.

== History ==
Following the French Revolution, the town council initially rented premises for its meetings, but held a ball to celebrate after establishing its first municipal offices in 1839. However, within two decades this building was dilapidated and cramped and, in May 1864, the council decided to relocate to the home of the Mayet family at No. 1 Avenue de Condé, near Place de l'Église. A few years later, the town council considered the matter again and decided to relocate to a more central location. The site they selected, on the south side of what is now Avenue Victor Hugo, was owned by Sieur Mahieu. The new building was designed by Henri Ratouin in the Louis XIII style, built in ashlar stone and was completed in 1876.

The original design involved a symmetrical main frontage of just five bays facing onto Avenue Victor Hugo. The central section of the three bays, which was slightly projected forward, featured a short flight of steps leading up to a segmental headed doorway with a keystone, flanked by a pair of round headed windows with keystones. There were three casement windows with triangular pediments and a central balcony on the first floor. The first-floor windows were flanked by Corinthian order pilasters supporting an entablature, a modillioned cornice and an ornate parapet with a central clock flanked by pilasters supporting a segmental pediment. Behind the clock, there was a steep roof surmounted by an octagonal belfry. The adjoining bays were fenestrated by round headed windows on the ground floor, by square headed windows with cornices on the first floor, and by dormer windows at attic level. Internally, the principal rooms were the Salle des Fêtes (ballroom), which was 42 metres (138 ft) long and 12 metres (39 ft) wide, and the Salle des Mariages (wedding room), which was decorated with murals painted by Paul Baudoin depicting family, work, marriage and war.

In 1930, following significant population growth, the town council, led by the mayor, Auguste Marin, decided to expand the building. The work was carried out to a design by Lucien Graf and most of the structural work was completed by 1939, although the modifications to the main frontage and the fitting out was completed later. The expansion involved pavilions on both sides of the existing building.

Following liberation of the town by the French 2nd Armoured Division, commanded by General Philippe Leclerc, on 26 August 1944, a plaque was installed in the foyer of the town hall to commemorate the lives of local people who died at the hands of the Germans during the Second World War, either because they were transported to concentration camps or because they fought for the French Resistance.

Work on the modifications initiated by Marin resumed after the war. They involved the introduction of three new doorways flanked by pairs of Doric order columns on the ground floor, and the extension of the first-floor balcony right across the central section. A pair of statues by Albert Leclerc, depicting a female figure holding a coiled eel and a male figure holding a model of a castle, were installed adjacent to the clock. The left-hand pavilion accommodated the Salle du Conseil (council chamber), while the right-hand pavilion accommodated a new conference room. Murals by Yves Brayer and Paul Girol and sculptures by André Bizette-Lindet were installed in the room around the same time.

A sculpture entitled Le Grand Rocher (the Great Rock) by the sculptor, Pierre Lagénie, was unveiled in the garden to the east of the building in 2005.
