= Gilbert Noël =

French politician

Gilbert Noël (26 September 1926 – 17 March 1999) was a French politician.

Gilbert Noël was born in Paris on 26 September 1926. He trained as a veterinarian and worked as an inspector in slaughterhouses. He served as mayor of Saint-Maur-des-Fossés from 1959 until his 1977 defeat by Jean-Louis Beaumont. Noël sat in the National Assembly representing Paris from 9 February 1966 to 2 April 1967, and Val-de-Marne from 8 May 1967 to 30 May 1968. While representing Paris, he was affiliated with Union for the New Republic. Upon its dissolution and assuming the Val-de-Marne seat, Noël switched to the Union of Democrats for the Republic. He was a chevalier of the ordre national du Mérite. Noël died at home in Saint-Maur-des-Fossés on 17 March 1999.
