= Loi Carrez =

French law

The loi Carrez, or Carrez law is a French law enacted on 18 December 1996 which obliges the vendor of a property lot (or fraction of a lot) in a condominium to specifically mention the surface area in all documents relating to the property sold. It is named after its author Gilles Carrez, the then RPR member of the National Assembly for the Val-de-Marne's 5th constituency.

The law does not apply to sales of property not yet constructed, which comes under the building code, nor to construction land.

== Calculation of floor area ==
The effective usable surface area, known as the "superficie Carrez", is the total enclosed floor area of an apartment or other construction discounting walls, partitions, staircases and stairwells, piping and electricity conduits and ducting, window and door embrasures. Parts of the enclosed area which are of less than 1.8 metres (5.9 ft) in height are also excluded.

Lots, or fractions of lots of surface areas of less than 8 square metres (86 sq ft) are also excluded from the calculation of habitable surface area. Typically, maid's rooms (chambre de bonne) would fall into this category.

Cellars, garages, parking places, and other storage facilities sold as separate lots are also excluded.

== Redress ==
- If the floor area is not indicated in the legal sale contract of the property, the buyer may void the contract within one month of signing the contract.
- If the floor area is overstated by more than 5% in the sale contract, the buyer has the right, within one year, to demand a price reduction in proportion to the extent of overstatement.
- If the floor area is understated, the seller has no recourse.
