= Val-de-Marne's 5th constituency =

Constituency of the National Assembly of France

5th constituency of the Val-de-Marne
- inline Constituency of the National Assembly of France

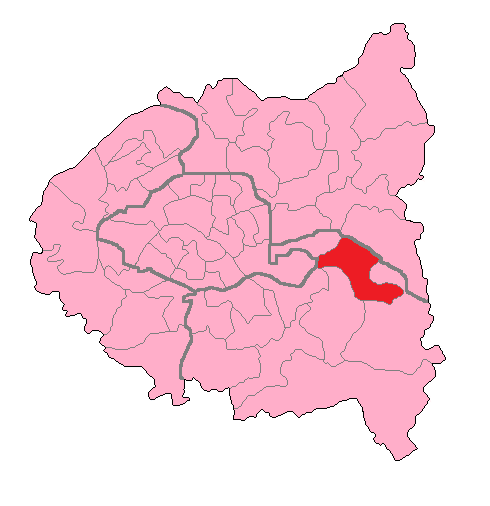
- Map of Val-de-Marne's 5th constituency shown within Ile-de-France (Petite Couronne)
- Deputy: Mathieu Lefevre; RE
- Department: Val-de-Marne
- Cantons: Bry-sur-Marne, Champigny-sur-Marne-Centre, Champigny-sur-Marne-Est, Nogent-sur-Marne, Le Perreux-sur-Marne
- Registered voters: 86,113

The Val-de-Marne's fifth constituency is a French legislative constituency in the Val-de-Marne département (east of Paris).

== Description ==
It is one of twelve in that département, and covers five cantons. While Champigny-sur-Marne has a secure communist majority, it is outweighed by conservative majorities in the smaller towns of Bry-sur-Marne, Le Perreux-sur-Marne and Nogent-sur-Marne. Nogent was added to the constituency as part of the 2010 redistricting of French legislative constituencies.

== Historic Representation ==
Election	Member	Party
1967	Pierre Billotte	UDR
1968	Pierre Billotte	UDR
1973	Pierre Billotte	UDR
1978	Jean-Louis Beaumont	DVD
1981	Laurent Cathala	PS
1986	Proportional representation - no election by constituency	
1988	Michel Giraud	RPR
1993	Gilles Carrez	RPR
1997	Gilles Carrez	RPR
2002	Gilles Carrez	UMP
2007	Gilles Carrez	UMP
2012	Gilles Carrez	UMP
2017	Gilles Carrez	LR
2022	Mathieu Lefevre	RE

== Election results ==
=== 2024 ===
Legislative Election 2024: Val-de-Marne's 5th constituency
Party	Candidate	Votes	%	±%
REC	Simone Benouadah	853	1.40	
PCF (NFP)	Julien Léger	22,657	37.27	
DVC	Catherine Molinari	717	1.18	
DVC	Maeva Sara Angèle	179	0.29	
RN	Isabelle Huguenin-Richard	12,401	20.40	
RE (Ensemble)	Mathieu Lefevre	23,416	38.52	
LO	François Joslin	563	0.93	
Turnout		60,786	97.76	
Registered electors		91,674		
2nd round result
RE	Mathieu Lefevre	26,159	43.27	
PCF	Julien Léger	23,845	39.44	
RN	Isabelle Huguenin-Richard	10,448	17.28	
Turnout		60,452	98.32	
Registered electors		91,708		
RE hold				

=== 2022 ===
Legislative Election 2022: Val-de-Marne's 5th constituency
Party	Candidate	Votes	%	±%
PCF (NUPÉS)	Julien Leger	13,452	31.58	+8.97
LREM (Ensemble)	Mathieu Lefevre	12,544	29.45	-7.66
LR (UDC)	Paul Bazin	8,564	8.30	−7.55
RN	Isabelle Huguenin-Richard	3,537	8.30	+2.20
REC	Stéphanie Veyssiere	2,197	5.16	N/A
PA	Frédéric Duboucher	870	2.04	N/A
Others	N/A	1,427		
Turnout		43,309	47.98	−0.64
2nd round result
LREM (Ensemble)	Mathieu Lefevre	23,010	56.47	+6.96
PCF (NUPÉS)	Julien Leger	17,739	43.53	N/A
Turnout		40,749	47.46	+6.06
LREM gain from LR				

=== 2017 ===
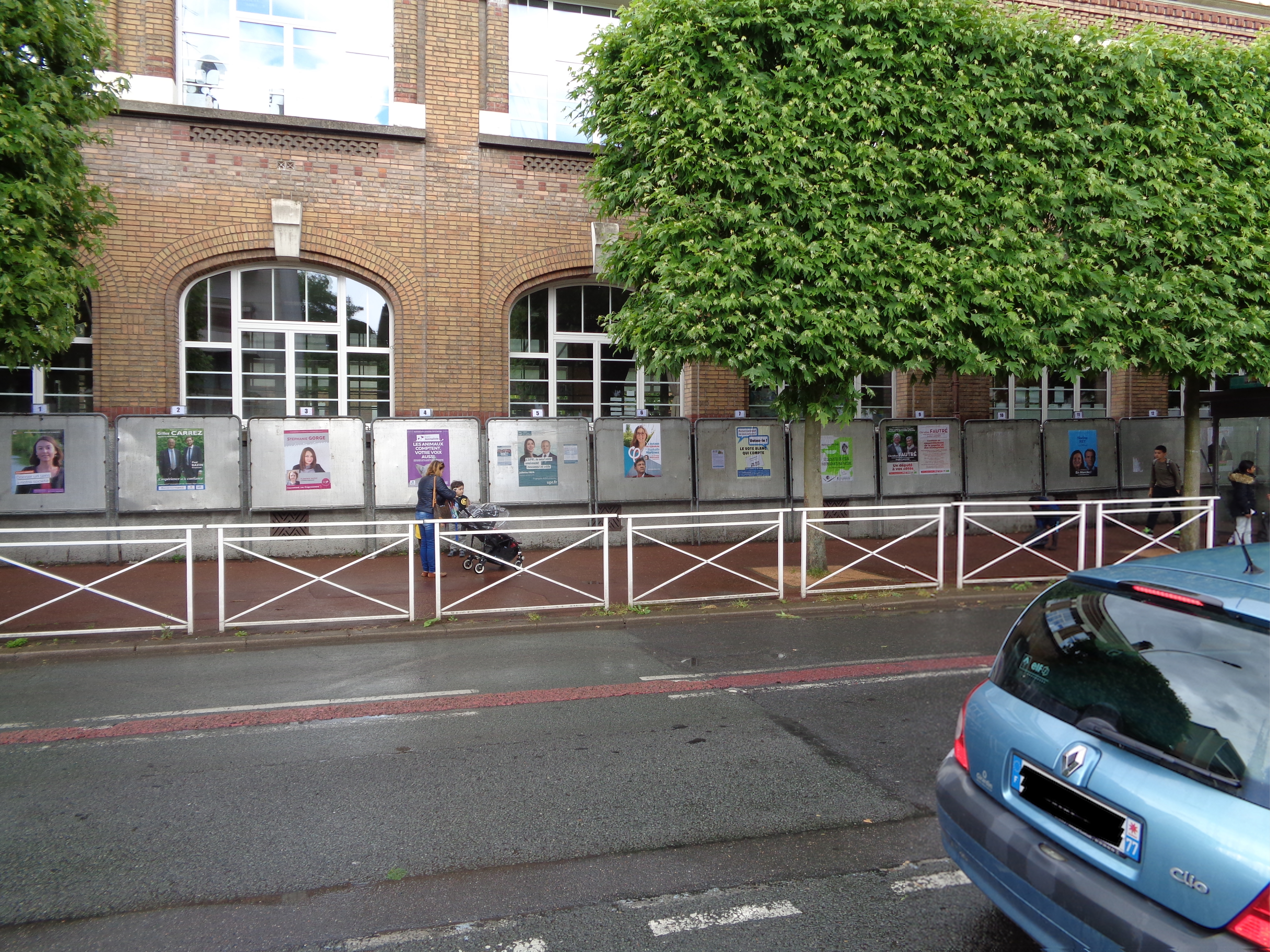
Official campaign posters during the 2017 parliamentary elections. (Click to enlarge.)

The election results in this constituency in 2017 were fairly typical of the nationwide results. The traditional main parties of the centre-right (LR) and of the centre-left (PS) suffered a significant decline, while the newly created party of the new President Emmanuel Macron topped the poll in the first round. Outgoing MP Gilles Carrez (LR), who was aiming for a sixth consecutive term, for once failed to finish first, but was qualified for the second round. The France insoumise candidate confirmed her party's rise as the new main force of the left by finishing third, well ahead of the Socialist Party candidate.
The results in this constituency differed between the communes (towns) that compose it, as they always do. In Communist-governed Champigny, En Marche! candidate Nadine Ret came first with 30.6%, but the Communist Party candidate was second with 19.62%, followed by the France insoumise candidate (14.79%), giving the mainstream radical left a total of 34.41%. Outgoing MP Gilles Carrez (LR) was fourth, with 13.92%. Whereas in the three centre-right-governed towns, the results were different. In Le Perreux, Gilles Carrez (the town's former mayor) was first (38.48%), Nadine Ret second (34.16%), and France insoumise candidate Raphaëlle Martinez third (8.69%). In Bry, Ret was first (41.77%), Carrez second (30.57%), and Martinez third (8.19%). In Nogent, the results were similar to Bry: Ret first (44.71%), Carrez second (28.36%) and Martinez third (8.03%).

In the second round, Gilles Carrez was narrowly re-elected with 50.5% of the votes. There was a record-high level of abstention (58.60%) and 8.30% of blank or spoiled ballots.

Legislative Election 2017: Val-de-Marne 5th - 2nd round
Party	Candidate	Votes	%	±%
LR	Gilles Carrez	17,145	50.49	−3.57
LREM	Nadine Ret	16,815	49.51	n/a
Turnout		37,034	41.40	−12.45
LR hold		Swing	-3.57	

Legislative Election 2017: Val-de-Marne 5th - 1st round
Party	Candidate	Votes	%	±%
LREM	Nadine Ret	15,962	37.11	n/a
LR	Gilles Carrez	11,898	27.66	−13.23
LFI	Raphaëlle Martinez	4,397	10.22	n/a
PCF	Christian Fautré	3,263	7.59	−5.79
FN	Isabelle Huguenin-Richard	2,625	6.10	−2.4
PS	Caroline Adomo	2,066	4.80	−22.47
AEI	Marie-José Deloire	821	1.91	+1.13
Miscellaneous	Kristell Labous	656	1.52	n/a
PA	Thibaut Tanguy	616	1.43	n/a
UPR	Juliette Fafa	308	0.72	n/a
Miscellaneous	Stéphane Guyot	179	0.42	n/a
LO	François Joslin	172	0.40	+0.11
DVG	Stéphanie Gorge	48	0.11	n/a
DLF	Dominique Stefanoff	6	0.01	−0.78
Turnout		43,497	48.62	−6.48

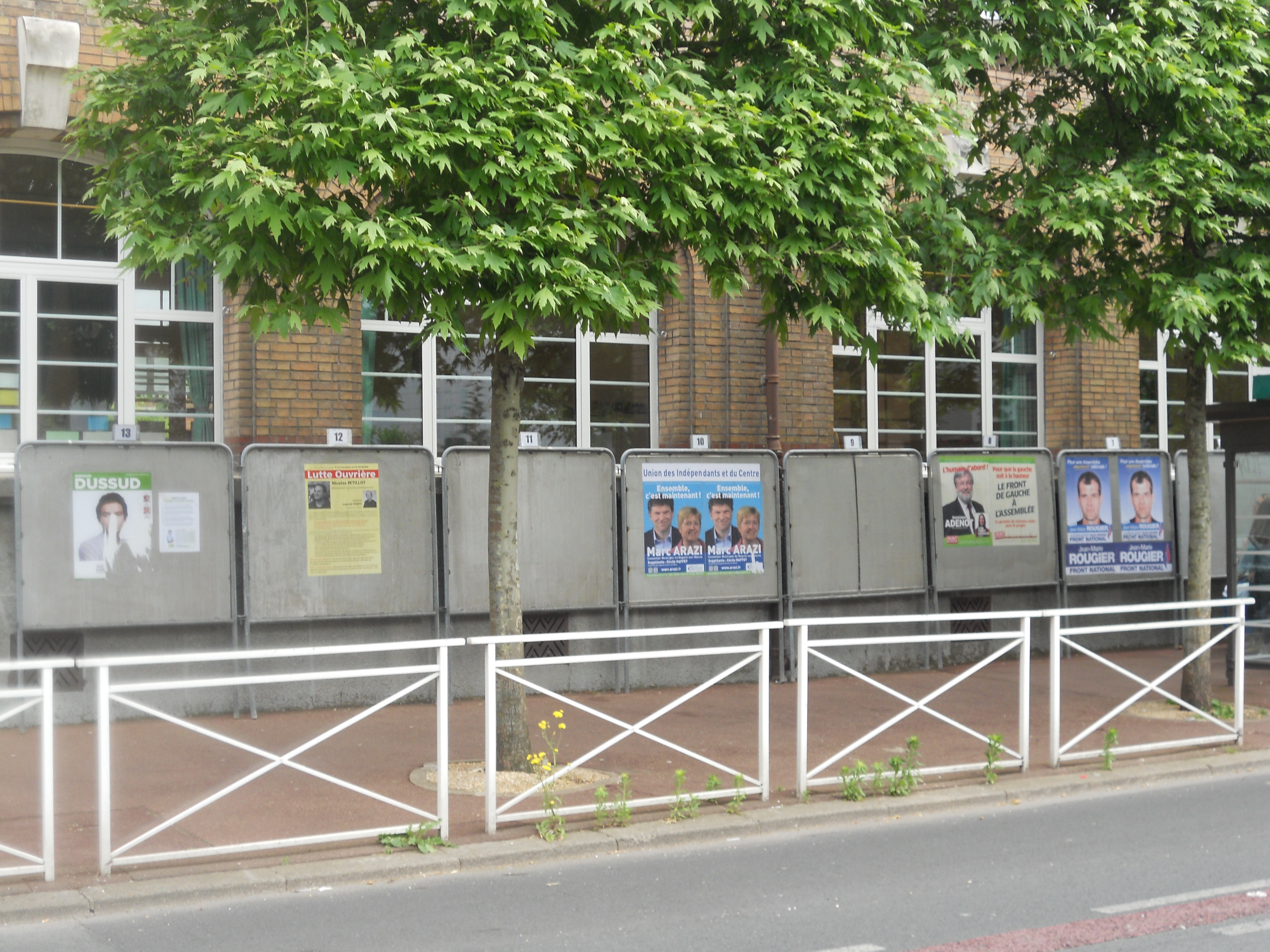
Official campaign posters in Bry-sur-Marne for the 2012 legislative election. (One of the posters has been partly torn off, a frequent occurrence.)

=== 2012 ===
As ever, results differed between the various communes which make up the constituency. In Champigny-sur-Marne, Dominique Adenot, the town's Communist mayor, finished first in the first round, with 30,93% - followed by Caroline Adomo (27.33%) and Gilles Carrez (22.81%). By contrast, in Bry-sur-Marne, Carrez obtained 47,33%, Adomo a result similar to that she had in Champigny (27,81%), while Adenot obtained just 5.43% (which placed him fourth, behind the National Front). Nogent-sur-Marne gave 46,92% to Carrez, 28,11% to Adomo and just 5.01% to Adenot, again placing him fourth. Le Perreux-sur-Marne gave 52,92% to Carrez, 26,13% to Adomo, and 4,93% to Adenot (fourth). The addition of Nogent to the constituency contributed to weakening the radical left.

Legislative Election 2012: Val-de-Marne 5th - 2nd round
Party	Candidate	Votes	%	±%
UMP	Gilles Carrez	24,542	54.06	−1.55
PS	Caroline Adomo	20,854	45.94	n/a
Turnout		46 374	53.85	−0.14
UMP hold		Swing	-1.55	

Legislative Election 2012: Val-de-Marne 5th - 1st round
Party	Candidate	Votes	%	±%
UMP	Gilles Carrez	19,184	40.89	−5.16
PS	Caroline Adomo	12,794	27.27	+11.29
FG	Dominique Adenot	6,276	13.38	−3.12
FN	Jean-Marie Rougier	3,987	8.50	+4.86
EELV	Arnaud Dussud	1,308	2.79	−0.6
MoDem	Jessica Perniceni	1,258	2.68	−6.82
MRC	Marc Badel	569	1.21	n/a
DVD	Marc Arazi	392	0.84	n/a
AEI	Grégory Gautier	364	0.78	+0.22
DLR	Julie Guicheteau	323	0.79	n/a
PLD	Lydie Zhu	175	0.37	n/a
NPA	Sylvette Minaert	151	0.32	−1.84
LO	Nicolas Pétillot	136	0.29	−0.25
Turnout		47,449	55.10	−3.36

=== 2007 ===
Legislative Election 2007: Val-de-Marne 5th - 2nd round
Party	Candidate	Votes	%	±%
UMP	Gilles Carrez	18 044	55.61	
PCF	Dominique Adenot	14 404	44.39	
Turnout		33 460	53.99	
UMP hold		Swing	-2.4	

Legislative Election 2007: Val-de-Marne 5th - 1st round
Party	Candidate	Votes	%	±%
UMP	Gilles Carrez	16 511	46.05	
PCF	Dominique Adenot	5 915	16.5	
PS	Marie-Odile Dufour	5 728	15.98	
MoDem	Jean-Pierre Barnaud	3 406	9.5	
FN	Hervé Leroy	1 304	3.64	
LV	Anne-Marie Xambeu	1 215	3.39	
LCR	Vincent Robin	774	2.16	
MPF	Jacques Venot	456	1.27	
France in Action	Leonce Bellemare	200	0.56	
LO	Véronique Hunaut	194	0.54	
MNR	Monique Demezuk	143	0.4	
Humanist	Jean-Michel Baroche	5	0.01	
Turnout		36 232	58.46	

=== 2002 ===
Legislative Election 2002: Val-de-Marne 5th – 2nd round
Party	Candidate	Votes	%	±%
UMP	Gilles Carrez	18 348	58.01	
PS	Evelyne Picard	13 280	41.99	
Turnout		32 524	57.1	
UMP hold		Swing	+3.31	

Legislative Election 2002: Val-de-Marne 5th - 1st round
Party	Candidate	Votes	%	±%
UMP	Gilles Carrez	15 085	42.26	
PS	Evelyne Picard	6 387	17.89	
PCF	Jean-Louis Bargero	5 402	15.13	
FN	Jean Viedemann	3 232	9.05	
UDF	Jean-Pierre Barnaud	1 756	4.92	
LV	Jean-François Collin	1 474	4.13	
PR	Sylvaine Ettori	511	1.43	
LCR	Valérie Techer	394	1.10	
Other	Philippe Valette	330	0.92	
MNR	Yann Greiner	281	0.79	
LO	Véronique Hunaut	259	0.73	
DVE	Fréderic Venant	204	0.57	
MPF	Christian Daniault	159	0.45	
Other	Alphonse Loemba	83	0.23	
CPNT	Aline Guillou	72	0.20	
DVG	Philippe Ghebbi	64	0.18	
Other	Achille Birba	0	0.00	
Other	Jean-Pierre Dujols	0	0.00	
Turnout		36 117	63.40	

=== 1997 ===
Legislative Election 1997: Val-de-Marne 5th – 2nd round
Party	Candidate	Votes	%	±%
RPR	Gilles Carrez	20 175	54.7	
PCF	Jean-Louis Bargero	16 711	45.3	
Turnout		38 944	70.32	
RPR hold		Swing	-5.58	

== Sources ==
- Official results of French elections from 2007
- Official results of French elections from 2002
- Results of French elections from 1997 (Le Figaro)
