= Church of St. Nicholas, Saint-Maur-des-Fossés =

Roman Catholic church in Val-de-Marne, France

Church of St. Nicholas
- French: Église Saint-Nicolas de Saint-Maur-des-Fossés
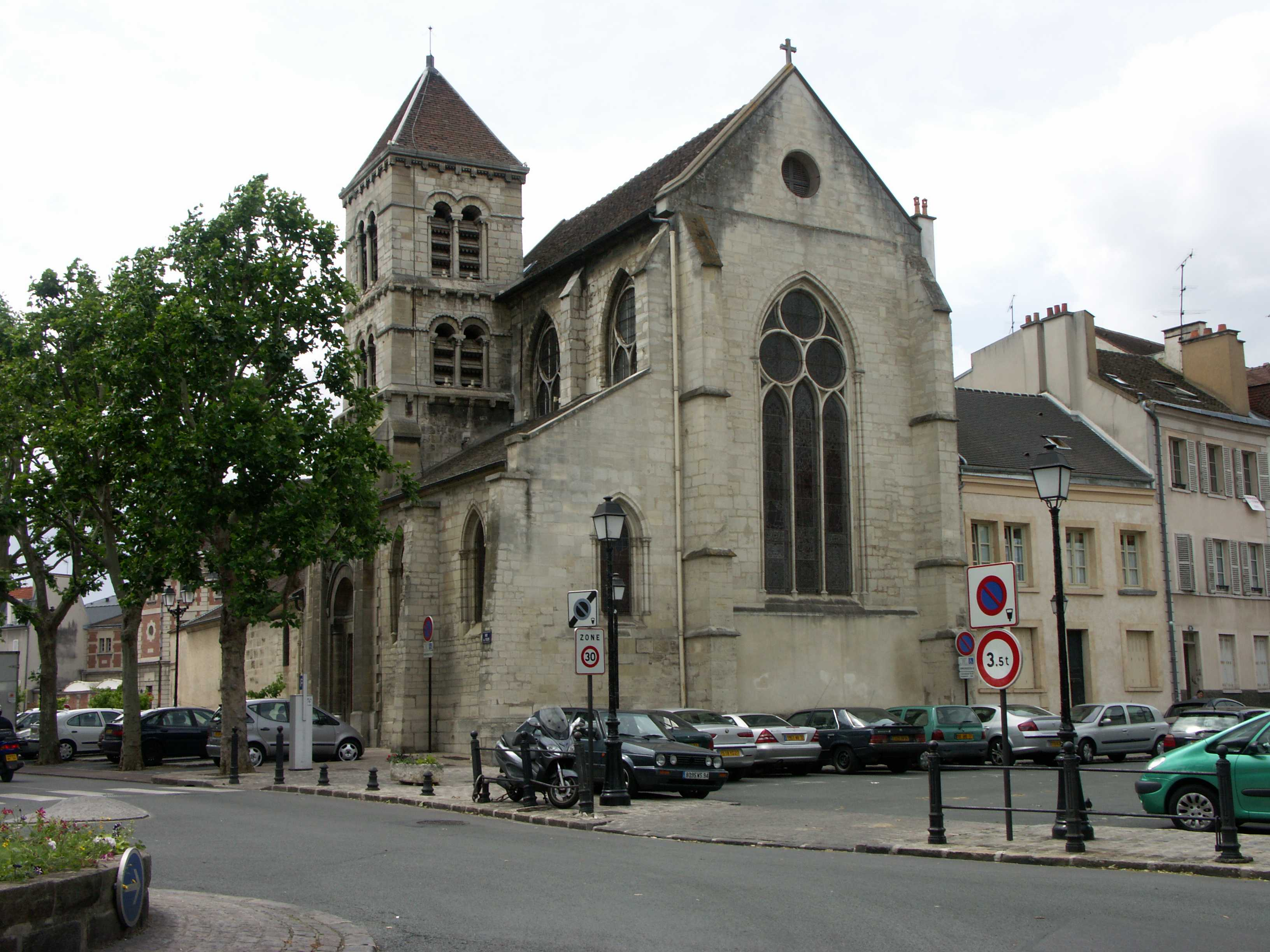

- Location within Paris and the inner ring
- 48°48′45″N 2°28′21″E
- Location: Saint-Maur-des-Fossés, Val-de-Marne
- Country: France
- Denomination: Roman Catholic

History
- Status: Church
- Dedication: St. Nicholas

Architecture
- Functional status: Active
- Architectural type: Church

Administration
- Diocese: Créteil

Monument historique
- Official name: Eglise Saint-Nicolas
- Criteria: Class MH
- Designated: February 3, 1947
- Reference no.: PA00079901

The Church of St. Nicolas (French: église Saint-Nicolas de Saint-Maur-des-Fossés) is a Roman Catholic church located in Saint-Maur-des-Fossés in the department of Val-de-Marne, France.

== History ==
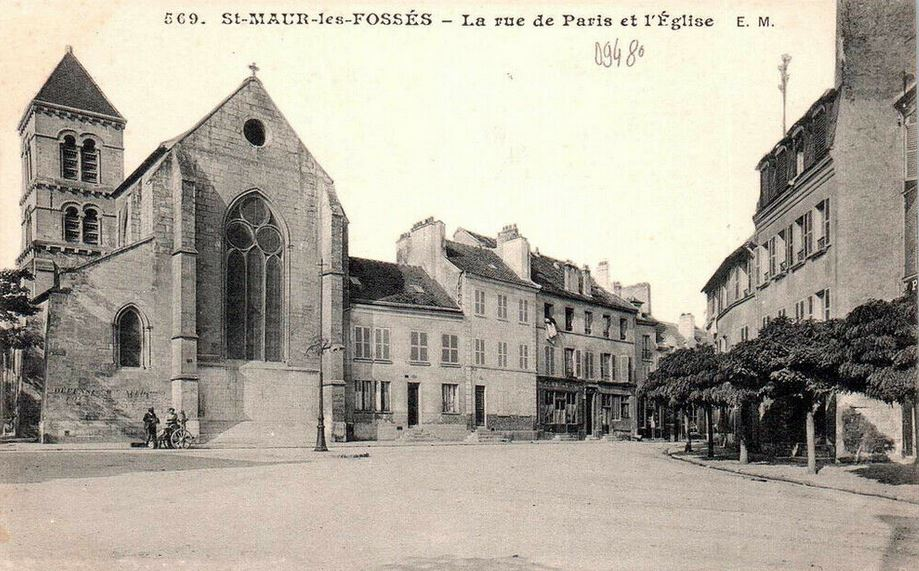
Saint-Maur-des-Fossés: Rue de Paris and church of St. Nicholas

A chapel dedicated to St. Nicholas was mentioned in two abbey manuscripts in 1137 during the Miracle of Rain: after an intense drought that hit all Western Europe, the monks of Saint-Maur Abbey organised a procession of the relics of St. Maur to the boundary of the fiefdom, near Charenton. When they came back, a violent storm broke out while they were saying the Mass in the chapel of St. Nicholas.

The church was listed as a Class Historic Monument on February 3, 1947.

On January 7, 2018, the Mass celebrated in the Church of St. Nicholas on the day of Epiphany was broadcast live in France 2's Catholic programme Le Jour du Seigneur. In 2019, the church launched a fundraising campaign for restoration of the church due to the need to remove a 1930s vaulted ceiling to restore the original 12th century roof. An initial €910,000 was approved by the municipal council, with the Fondation du patrimoine starting a public subscription to assist with payments.

== Pilgrimage ==
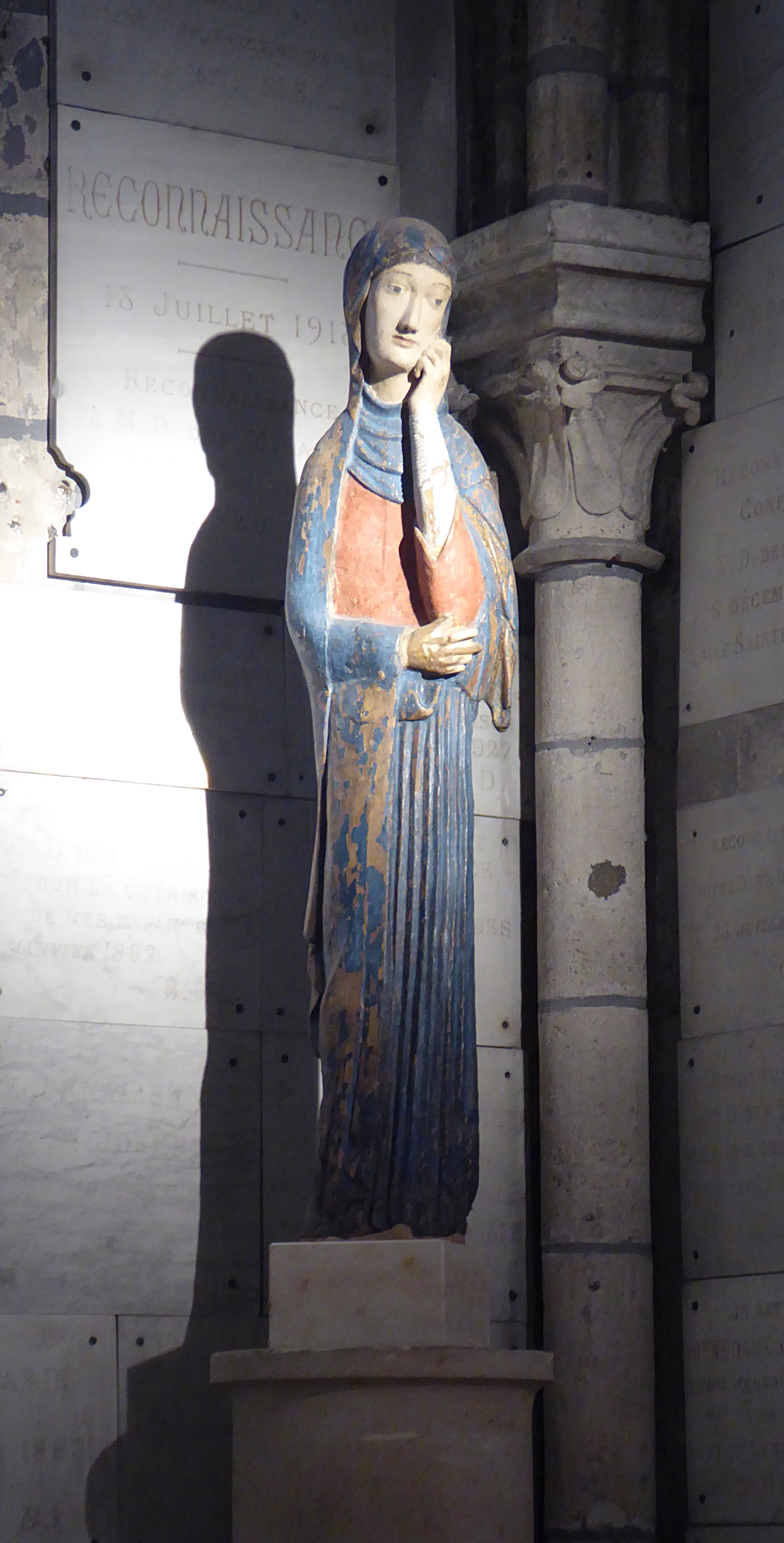
The statue of Notre-Dame des Miracles.

A Marian pilgrimage to Notre-Dame-des-Miracles took place at the church for nearly nine centuries until 1968. The pilgrimage resumed in 1988. According to the 1328 story of Regnault de Citry, a statue of the Virgin Mary was ordered by William de Corbeil and miraculously appeared in the workshop of a sculptor on 10 July 1068. According to the tradition, the statue is acheiropoieta (i.e. made without hands). The statue was originally placed in the care of the Daughters of Charity of Saint Vincent de Paul. During the French Revolution, their Abbey church was destroyed but the statue survived as it was placed in the care of secular friends and then installed in the Church of St Nicholas. Its presence has been attributed to Saint-Maur-des-Fossés being untouched by German artillery bombardments in the Franco-Prussian War. It later gained a modern nickname of "The Virgin on the Telephone" due to the placement of the statue's hands.
