= Henri Plagnol =

French politician

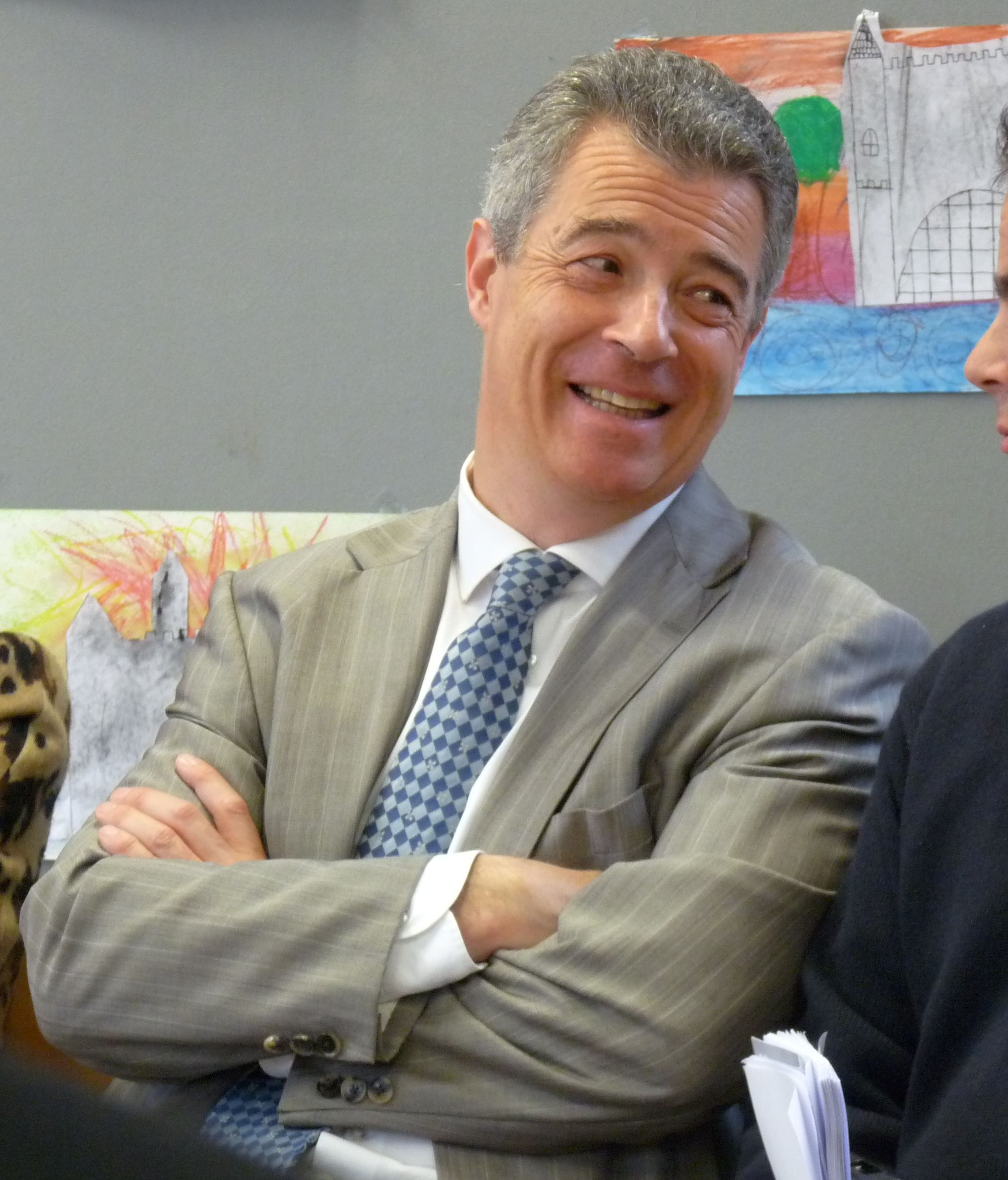

Henri Plagnol (born February 11, 1961, in Paris) is a French politician who has served on the National Assembly. He represented the Val-de-Marne department from 1997 to 2002 and again from 2007 to 2012. Throughout his legislature tenure, Plagnol has been affiliated with the Union for French Democracy, the Union for a Popular Movement and the Union of Democrats and Independents.

Plagnol served as deputy mayor of Saint-Maur-des-Fossés from 1997, and contested the office in 2008, after Jean-Louis Beaumont chose not to run for reelection. Plagnol remained mayor until 2014, when he lost reelection to Sylvain Berrios.
