= Gilles Carrez =

French politician (born 1948)

Member of the National Assembly for Val-de-Marne's 5th constituency
- In office 2 April 1993 – 22 June 2022
- Preceded by: Michel Giraud
- Succeeded by: Mathieu Lefèvre

Mayor of Le Perreux-sur-Marne
- In office 14 April 1992 – 2 December 2016
- Preceded by: Michel Giraud
- Succeeded by: Christel Royer

Personal details
- Born: 29 August 1948 (age 76); Paris, France
- Political party: The Republicans
- Education: Lycée Louis-le-Grand
- Alma mater: HEC Paris, ÉNA

Gilles Carrez (born 29 August 1948) is a French politician of the Republicans who served as a member of the National Assembly of France, representing the Val-de-Marne's 5th constituency, from 1993 to 2022. He did not stand for re-election in the 2022 French legislative election.

== Political positions ==
Carrez is the author of the 1996 Carrez law which obliges the vendor of a property lot (or fraction of a lot) in a condominium to specifically mention the surface area in all documents relating to the property sold.

In response to a 2019 law authorizing the sale of the government's controlling stake in Groupe ADP, Carrez supported a cross-party initiative which called for a referendum to overturn the legislation, citing concerns over the loss of government revenue and influence.

== Controversy ==
In October 2014, Carrez was found to have avoided paying the French solidarity tax on wealth (ISF) for three years by applying a 30 percent tax allowance on one of his homes. However, he had previously converted the home into an SCI, a private, limited company to be used for rental purposes. The 30 percent allowance does not apply to SCI holdings. Once this was revealed, Carrez declared, "if the tax authorities think that I should pay the wealth tax, I won't argue." At the time, Carrez was one of more than 60 French parliamentarians battling with the tax offices over 'dodgy' asset declarations.
