= Sylvain Berrios =

French politician

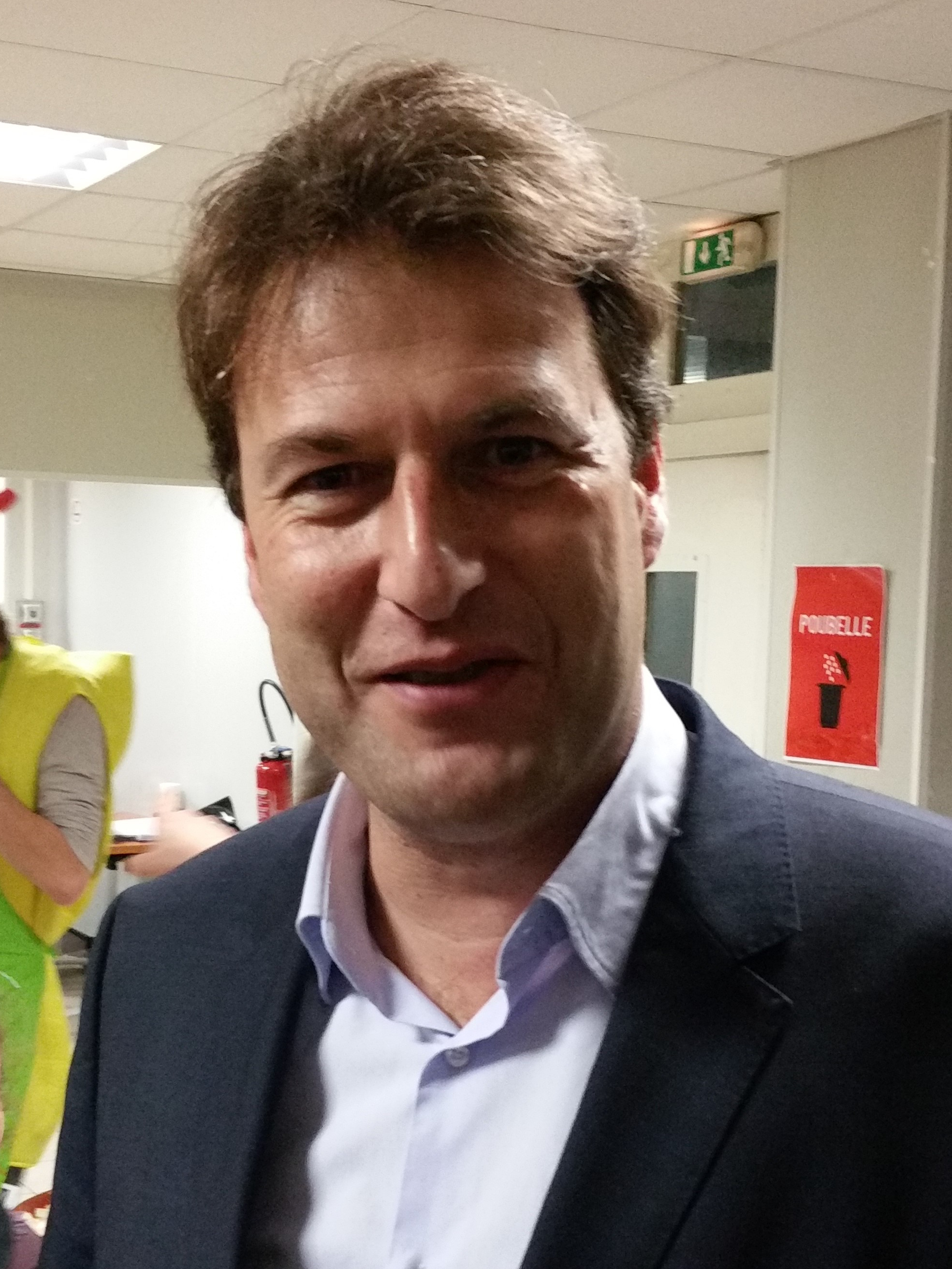

Mayor of Saint-Maur-des-Fossés
- Incumbent
- Assumed office 3 April 2014
- Preceded by: Henri Plagnol

Member of the National Assembly for Val-de-Marne's 1st constituency
- In office 17 December 2012 – 20 June 2017
- Preceded by: Henri Plagnol
- Succeeded by: Frédéric Descrozaille

Personal details
- Born: 6 May 1968 (age 57) Maisons-Alfort, France
- Party: Republicans

Sylvain Berrios (born 6 May 1968) is a French politician.

== Early life ==
Berrios was born on 6 May 1968 in Maisons-Alfort.

== Political career ==
Starting in 1992, Berrios served on the municipal council of Saint-Maur-des-Fossés. In 2002, he began working for Henri Plagnol. Four years later, Berrios joined the budget ministry. From 2008, he concurrently served as deputy mayor of Saint-Maur-des-Fossés, and general councilor in Val-de-Marne. Berrios defeated Plagnol in a 2012 legislative by-election, and served on the National Assembly from Val-de-Marne's 1st constituency as a member of the Union for a Popular Movement (UMP). His term as a deputy started on 17 December 2012 and lasted until 20 June 2017. Berrios later joined The Republicans, the successor to the UMP. Berrios remained a member of the Val-de-Marne general council until his resignation from that role in January 2013. In 2014, Berrios contested the mayoralty of Saint-Maur-des-Fossés, again defeating Plagnol, the incumbent. He was re-elected in the 2020 election.
