= Canton of Saint-Maur-des-Fossés-1 =

Coordinates: 48.80°N 2.49°E

The canton of Saint-Maur-des-Fossés-1 is an administrative division of the Val-de-Marne department, Île-de-France region, northern France. It was created at the French canton reorganisation which came into effect in March 2015. Its seat is in Saint-Maur-des-Fossés.

It consists of the following communes:

1. Saint-Maur-des-Fossés (partly)
