= Pierre Lagénie =

French sculptor (1938–2020)

- Born: 26 November 1938; Le Bouscat, France
- Died: 25 March 2020 (aged 81)
- Occupation: Sculptor

Pierre Lagénie (26 November 1938 – 25 March 2020) was a French sculptor.

== Biography ==
Lagénie studied at the École des Beaux-Arts in Bordeaux, and joined Marcel Gimond's studio at the École nationale supérieure des beaux-arts in Paris in 1957. He worked with bronze and his main source of inspiration was the female form.

According to the book Deux siècles d'arts à Bordeaux, Lagénie "has traced a path where his work becomes timeless, independent of his century, of his time". Le Spectacle du monde described Lagénie's work as "Patient, he models, molds, melts and chisels, performing all the ritual gestures of his art with an inexhaustible passion".

Pierre Lagénie died on 25 March 2020 at the age of 81.

== Notable works ==
- Sculpture of Ludovic Trarieux, on Display at the Palais de Justice de Bordeaux (1984)
- Hommage, located at the Square de Saint-Hilaire in Saint-Maur-des-Fossés (2000)

== Expositions ==
- Galerie Jean Jury à Clermont (1988)
- Musée Pissarro

== Publication ==
- Pierre Lagénie : l'univers d'un sculpteur (1987)
