= Jean-Louis Beaumont =

French politician (1925–2013)

Jean-Louis Beaumont (10 November 1925 – 31 August 2013) was a French politician.

He was born in Paris, France. He was a professor of medicine at the Henri-Mondor University Hospital.

Beaumont defeated incumbent mayor of Saint-Maur-des-Fossés Gilbert Noël in 1977, and remained in office until 2008, choosing not to run for reelection that year. Beaumont served on the National Assembly from 1978 to 1981 as a non-inscrit representing Val-de-Marne. He served his second term as a deputy from 1993 to 1997 representing Val-de-Marne's 1st constituency while affiliated with the Union for French Democracy, losing reelection to Henri Plagnol, an adviser of his municipal government. Beaumont died at home in Saint-Maur-des-Fossés, aged 87.
