= Mathieu Lefèvre =

French politician (born 1986)

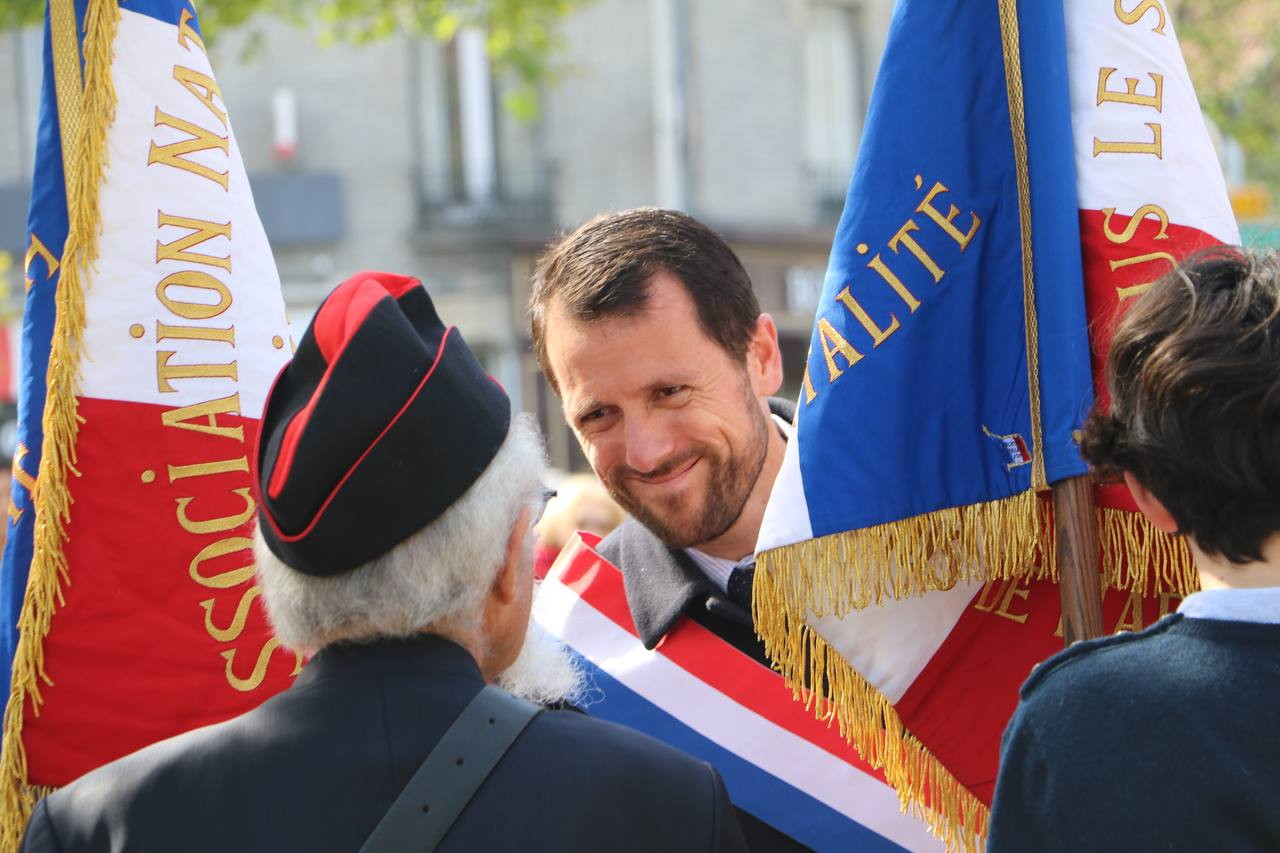
- Lefèvre in 2023

Minister Delegate for Relations with Parliament
- Incumbent
- Assumed office 5 October 2025
- Prime Minister: Sébastien Lecornu
- Preceded by: Patrick Mignola

Member of the National Assembly for Val-de-Marne's 5th constituency
- Incumbent
- Assumed office 22 June 2022
- Preceded by: Gilles Carrez

Personal details
- Born: 27 October 1986 (age 40) Créteil, France
- Party: Renaissance
- Education: Paris 1 Panthéon-Sorbonne University

Mathieu Lefèvre (born 27 October 1986) is a French politician of Renaissance who has been serving as Minister Delegate for the Ecological Transition in the government of Prime Minister Sébastien Lecornu since 2025. He previously served as a member of the National Assembly, representing Val-de-Marne's 5th constituency since the 2022 legislative election, and was re-elected in the 2024 election.

== Political career ==
In parliament, Lefèvre served on both the Finance Committee (2023–2025) and the Committee on Legal Affairs (2022–2025). In addition to his committee assignments, he chaired the French-Israeli Parliamentary Friendship Group from 2023 to 2024.
