= Frédéric Descrozaille =

French politician (born 1967)

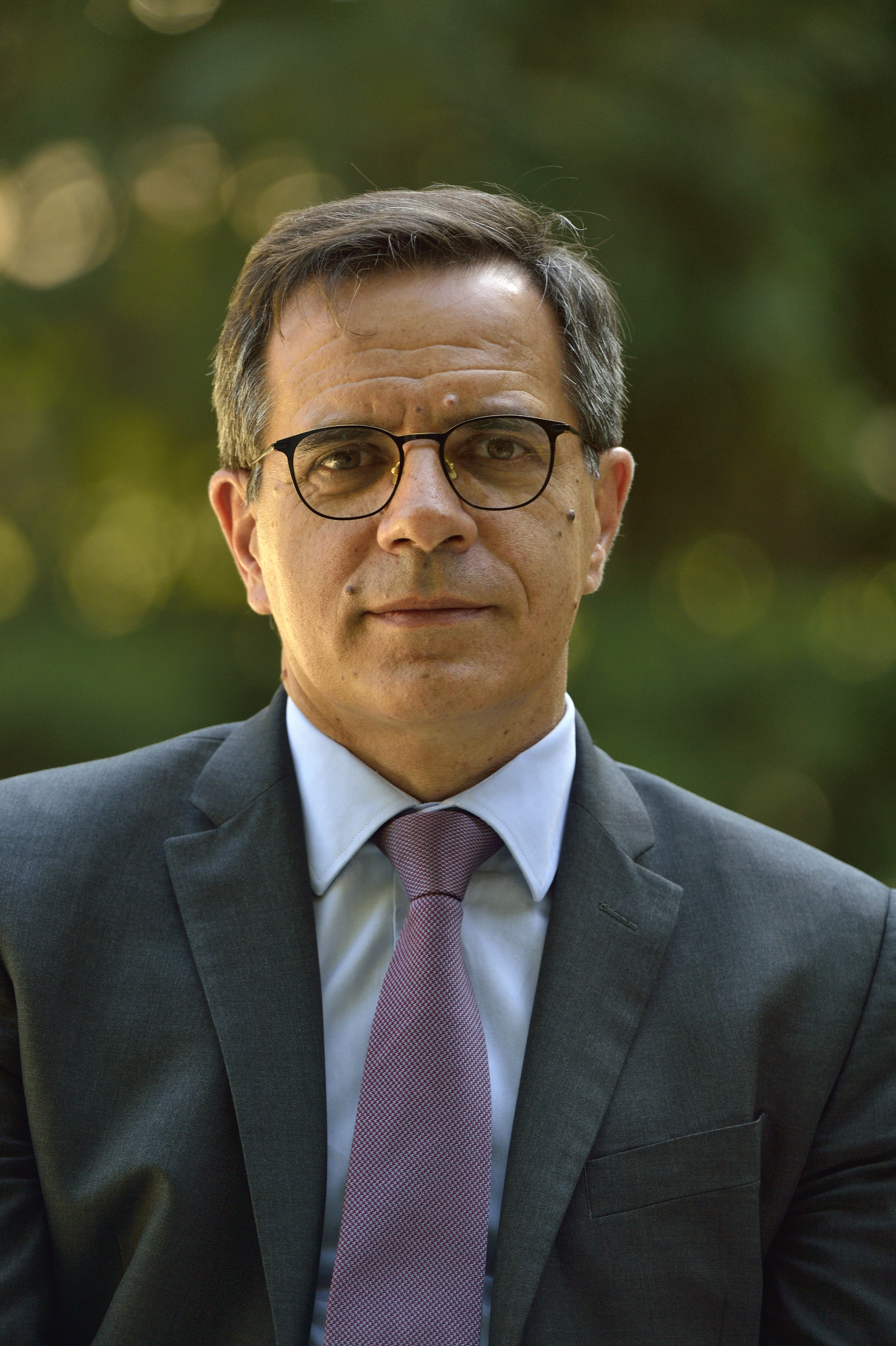

Member of the National Assembly for Val-de-Marne's 1st constituency
- In office 21 June 2017 – 9 June 2024
- Preceded by: Sylvain Berrios
- Succeeded by: Sylvain Berrios

Personal details
- Born: 16 April 1967 (age 58) Neuilly-sur-Seine, France
- Party: Renaissance (2016–present)
- Other political affiliations: Socialist Party (formerly); Democratic Movement (formerly); New Deal (formerly)
- Education: Lycée Louis-le-Grand; Lycée Sainte-Geneviève
- Alma mater: Institut national agronomique Sciences Po

Frédéric Descrozaille (French pronunciation: [fʁedeʁik dekʁozaj]; born 16 April 1967) is a French politician who represented the 1st constituency of the Val-de-Marne department in the National Assembly from 2017 to 2024. He is a member of Renaissance (RE).

== Political career ==
Prior to joining En Marche, later renamed La République En Marche! and Renaissance, Descrozaille was a member of the Socialist Party, Democratic Movement and New Deal in the 2000s and 2010s.

In the 2017 legislative election, Descrozaille was elected with 52.4% of the second-round vote to succeed Sylvain Berrios of The Republicans, who did not seek reelection to the National Assembly.

In Parliament, Descrozaille served on the Committee on Economic Affairs. Previously he served on the Committee on Foreign Affairs from 2017 to 2019. In 2021, he was appointed the National Assembly's rapporteur on climate risks for agriculture.

He was reelected in the 2022 election with 59% of the second-round vote.

In 2023, Descrozaille announced his candidacy to succeed Aurore Bergé as leader of the Renaissance parliamentary group but ultimately lost an internal vote against Sylvain Maillard, 20–80%.

Descrozaille sponsored a law to ban shops from offering discounts of more than 34% on drugstore, perfumery, hygiene and maintenance products. The law, which was blamed for fuelling inflation, took effect from March 2024. Descrozaille stated the law was aimed at shielding producers from pressure from distributors.

In the 2024 snap election, Descrozaille placed third in the first round, before withdrawing his name in the second round in favour of Berrios who placed second, with Berrios eventually winning the second round, thus retaking his former seat.
