= Saint-Maur-des-Fossés =

- Commune
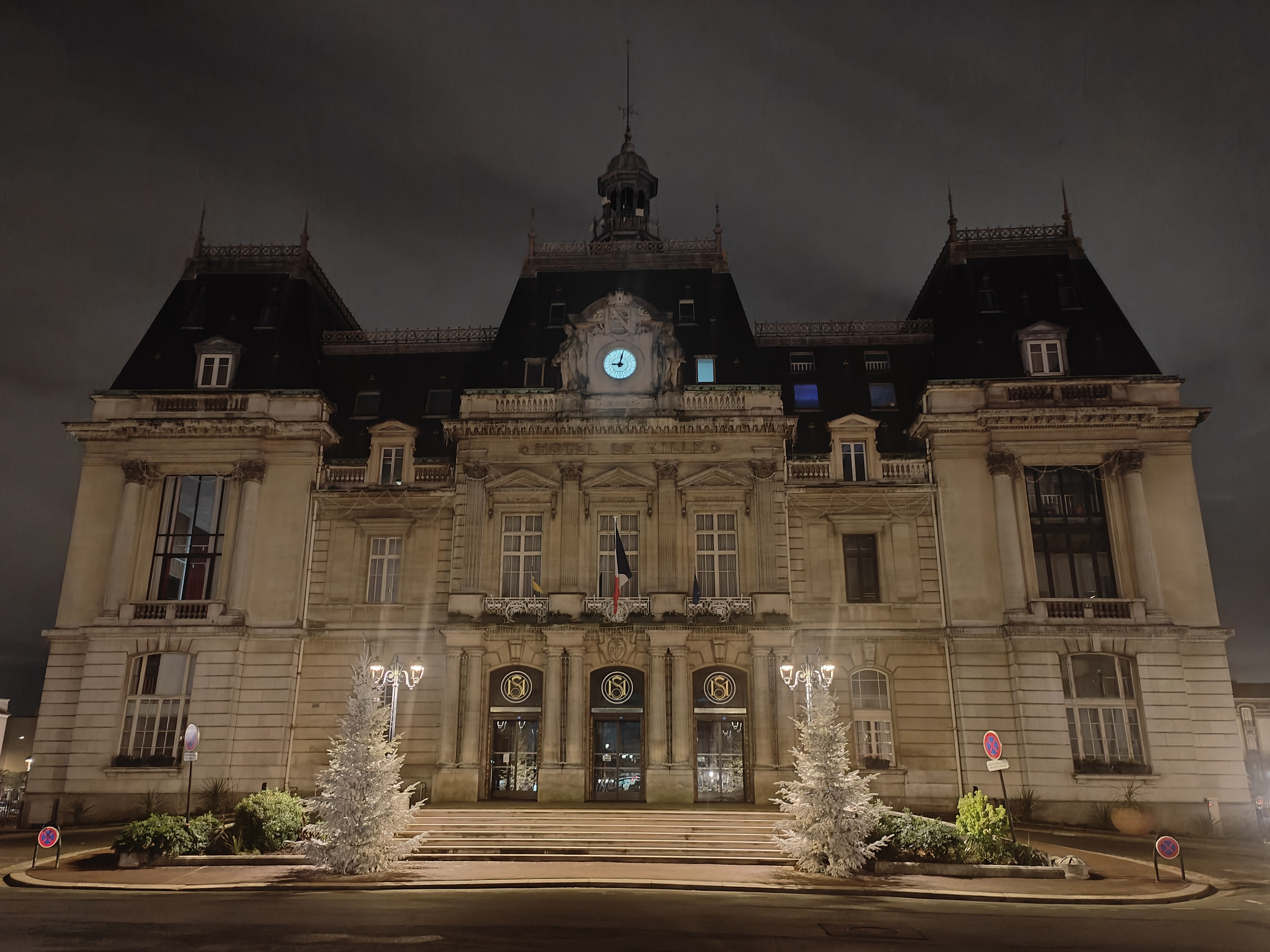
- The Hôtel de Ville (City Hall) in 2026

- Coat of arms

- Location (in red) within Paris inner suburbs
- Location of Saint-Maur-des-Fossés
- Location within France Location within Île-de-France (region)
- Coordinates: 48°47′58″N 2°29′59″E
- Country: France
- Region: Île-de-France
- Department: Val-de-Marne
- Arrondissement: Créteil
- Canton: Saint-Maur-des-Fossés-1 and 2
- Intercommunality: Grand Paris

Government
  - Mayor (2026–32): Pierre-Michel Delecroix
- Area^{1}: 11.25 km^{2} (4.34 sq mi)
- Highest elevation: 53 m (174 ft)
- Lowest elevation: 32 m (105 ft)
- Population (2023): 76,572
  - Density: 6,806/km^{2} (17,630/sq mi)
- Time zone: UTC+01:00 (CET)
  - Summer (DST): UTC+02:00 (CEST)
- INSEE/Postal code: 94068 /94100 (St Maur), 94210 (La Varenne)
- ^{1} French Land Register data, which excludes lakes, ponds, glaciers > 1 km^{2} (0.386 sq mi or 247 acres) and river estuaries.

Saint-Maur-des-Fossés (French pronunciation: [sɛ̃ mɔʁ de fose]) is a commune in Val-de-Marne, the southeastern suburbs of Paris, France, 11.7 kilometres (7.3 miles) from the centre of Paris.

== History ==
=== Abbey ===
Saint-Maur-des-Fossés owes its name to Saint-Maur Abbey, founded in 638 by Queen Nanthild, regent for her son Clovis II, at a place called Fossati in Medieval Latin and Les Fossés in modern French, meaning "the moats". This place, located at the narrow entrance of a loop where the river Marne made its way round a rocky outcrop, was probably named after the moats of an ancient Celtic oppidum and later a Roman castrum; the site was known in medieval documents as Castrum Bagaudarum, at a time when the marauding Bagaudae had developed a legendary reputation as defenders of Christians against Roman persecution. Massive foundations, sited so far from a Roman frontier, were attributed by C. Jullian to a temple or a villa instead. In Merovingian times, Gallo-Roman villas in the royal fisc were repeatedly donated as sites for monasteries under royal patronage.

The abbey, dedicated to Saint Peter, Saint Paul and the Virgin Mary, was called Sanctus Petrus Fossatensis in Medieval Latin (Saint Pierre des Fossés in French), meaning "Saint Peter of the Moats". It was founded by Blidegisil, archdeacon of Paris, in 638. One of the early abbots was Saint Babolen (died c. 671). In 868, King Charles the Bald invited the monks of the Abbey of Saint-Maur de Glanfeuil (in Le Thoureil, Maine-et-Loire, western France), who had fled their abbey due to Viking invasion, to relocate to Saint Pierre des Fossés with their precious relics of Saint Maurus.

Later in the Middle Ages, the relics of Saint Maurus became very famous as they were supposed to heal gout and epilepsy, and Saint Pierre des Fossés became one of the most famous pilgrimage centers of medieval France. The rededication to Saint Maurus, in which abbey was renamed Saint-Maur-des-Fossés ("Saint Maurus of the Moats"), was justified by the story that during a drought in 1137, prayers to the Virgin and Saints Peter and Paul having been ineffective, prayer to Saint Maur brought the needed rainfall.

=== Château ===
The abbey was secularised in 1535, and in 1541, the architect Philibert Delorme designed a château on the site for Cardinal Jean du Bellay, bishop of Paris, on four ranges of building around a square central court. Catherine de' Medici was a frequent visitor, preferring it to the château de Vincennes; in 1563 she acquired this "château du Bellay", and substantially rebuilt it. On September 23, 1568, her teenage son, King Charles IX, issued the Edict of Saint-Maur, which prohibited all religions but Catholicism. It prompted fierce religious intolerance in Paris and eventually led to the 1572, St. Bartholomew's Day massacre. Building projects at the site were only interrupted by Catherine's death (1589); the château was sold to the Condé family and was eventually completed, and furnished with extensive parterres, at the end of the seventeenth century.

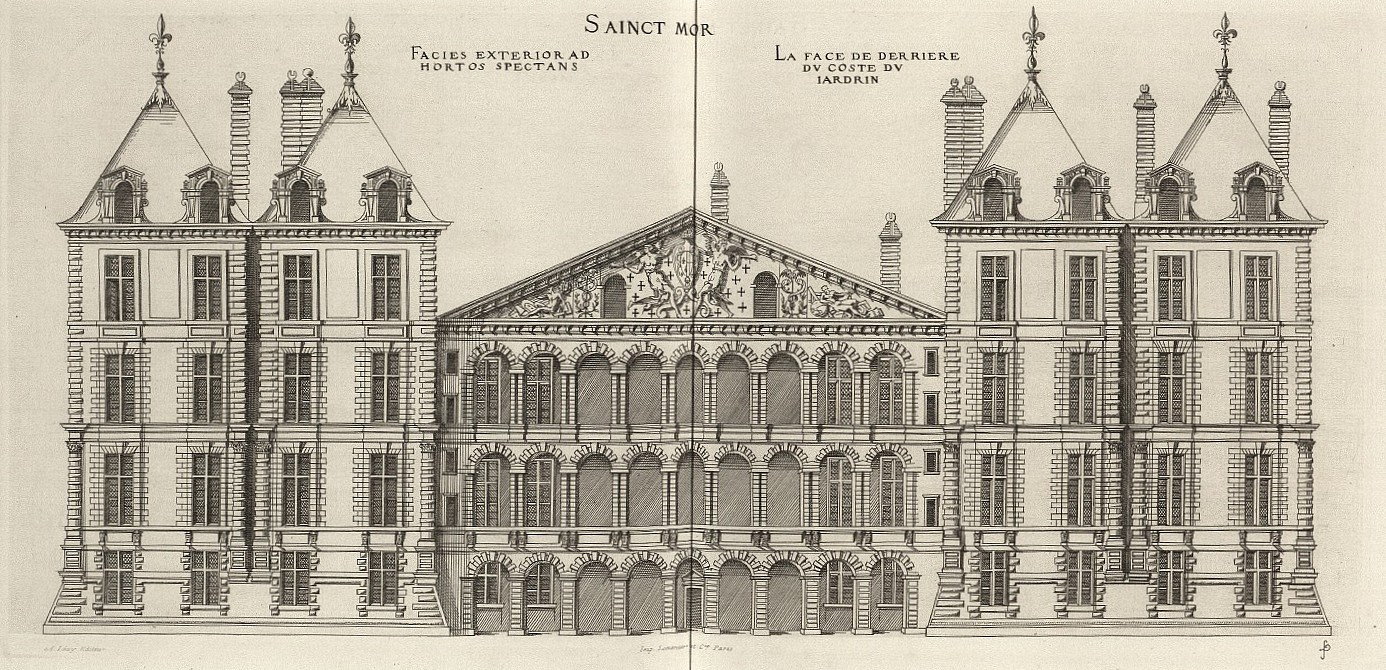
Château de Saint-Maur, architect: Philibert de l'Orme

The Château de Saint-Maur, still in the possession of the Condé family, was nationalised during the French Revolution, emptied of its contents, and its terrains divided up among real-estate speculators. The structure was demolished for the value of its materials; virtually nothing remains.

=== Village ===
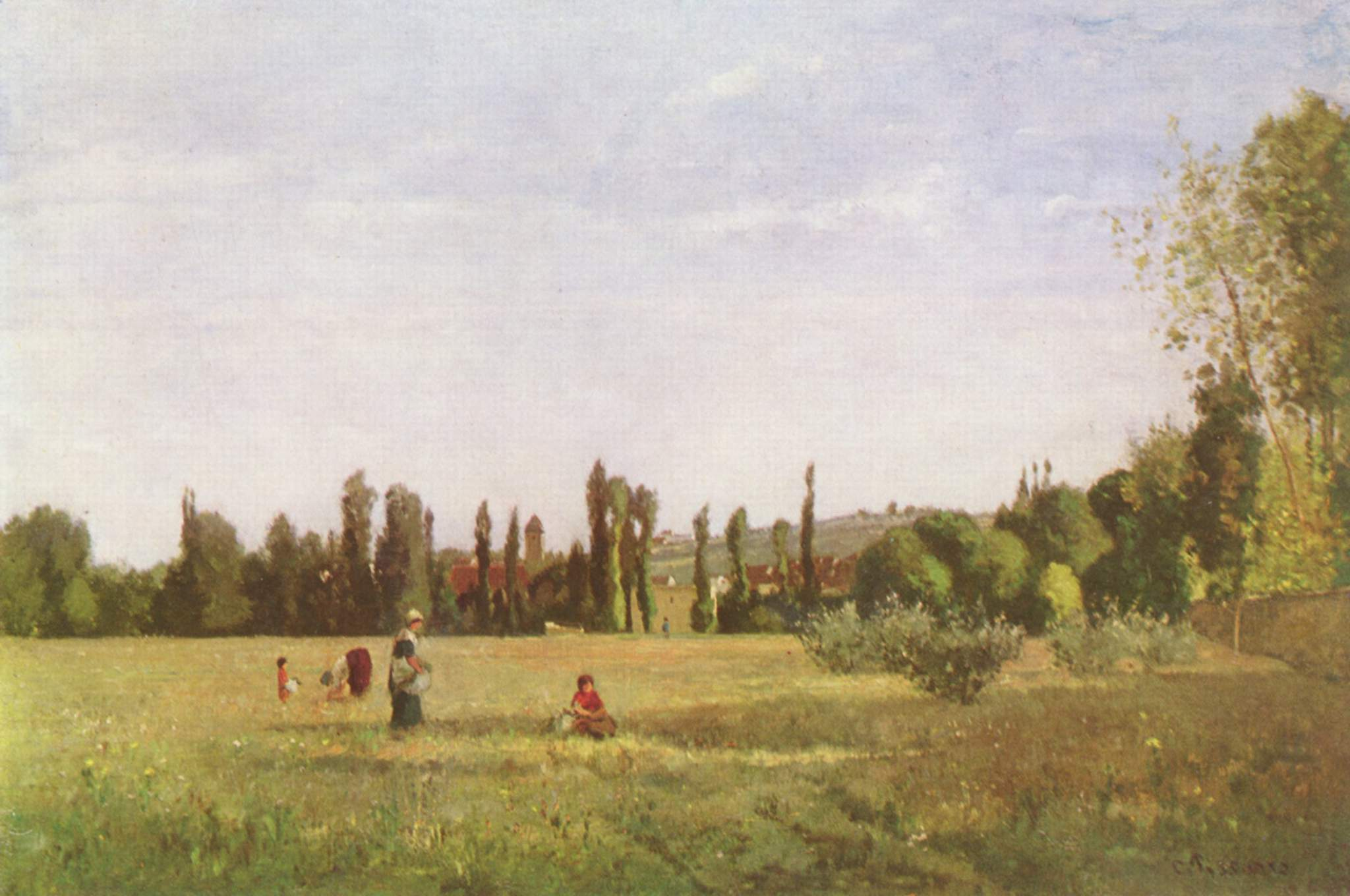
La Varenne-de-St.-Hilaire by Camille Pissarro, circa 1863

The little settlement that grew around the abbey, known as Saint-Maur-des-Fossés, developed a market during the thirteenth century. The present territory also includes a formerly distinct village, La Varenne-Saint-Hilaire, against the perimeter of the nearby game preserve of Saint-Hilaire, part of the abbey's domaines.

In 1791, part of the territory of Saint-Maur-des-Fossés was detached and became the commune of La Branche-du-Pont-de-Saint-Maur, later renamed Joinville-le-Pont.

After the abbey itself was abandoned, its church providing building materials in the town. During the French Revolution, Saint-Maur-des-Fossés was temporarily renamed Vivant-sur-Marne (meaning "Alive upon Marne") in a gesture of rejection of religion.

After the Revolution, the official name of the commune was simply Saint-Maur; it is only in 1897 that "des-Fossés" was re-added to the name, probably to conform to the historical name and also to distinguish Saint-Maur-des-Fossés from other communes of France also called Saint-Maur. In 1924, a few vestiges of the abbey were collected in the newly established Musée du vieux Saint-Maur. The Hôtel de Ville was completed in 1876, although the side pavilions were added later.

== Notable residents ==
Philippe Diolé (1908 – 1977), diver, writer and explorer, was born in Saint-Maur-des-Fossés.

Roland Douce (1939–2018), plant biologist, was born in Saint-Maur-des-Fossés.

Fabien Giroix (born 17 September 1960 in Saint-Maur-des-Fossés) is a French racing driver.

Manu Katché (born 27 October 1958 in Saint-Maur-des-Fossés) is a French drummer and songwriter.

Vincenzo Peruggia (1881–1925), an Italian thief who stole the Mona Lisa on 21 August 1911, died in Saint-Maur-des-Fossés.

Laurent Pimond (born 6 April 1965 in Saint-Maur-des-Fossés) is a former French footballer.

Germaine Tailleferre (1892–1983) was the only woman in the group of composers known as Les Six.

== Geography ==
Saint-Maur-des-Fossés is almost entirely surrounded by a loop of the river Marne.

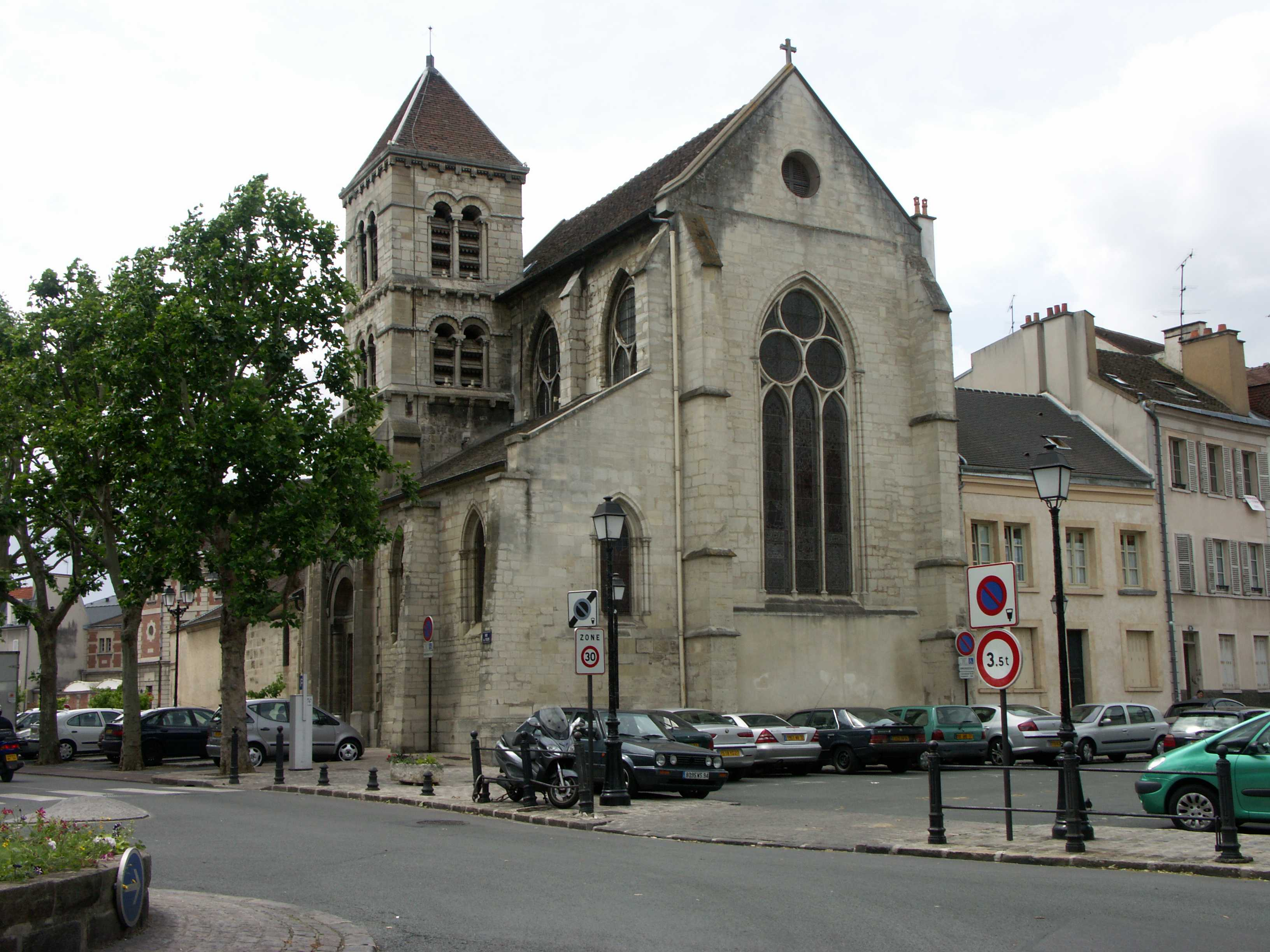
12th-14th century St Nicolas Church in the historical center of Saint-Maur-des-Fossés.

== Demographics ==
=== Population ===
Historical population

Year	Pop.	±% p.a.
1793	800	—
1800	561	−4.94%
1806	700	+3.76%
1821	711	+0.10%
1831	825	+1.50%
1836	1,073	+5.40%
1841	1,609	+8.44%
1846	1,561	−0.60%
1851	1,565	+0.05%
1856	2,431	+9.21%
1861	3,944	+10.16%
1866	5,621	+7.34%
1872	7,438	+4.78%
1876	8,433	+3.19%
1881	10,492	+4.47%
1886	15,802	+8.54%
1891	17,333	+1.87%
1896	20,503	+3.42%
1901	23,035	+2.36%

Year	Pop.	±% p.a.
1906	28,238	+4.16%
1911	33,852	+3.69%
1921	40,183	+1.73%
1926	49,745	+4.36%
1931	57,164	+2.82%
1936	56,740	−0.15%
1946	55,520	−0.22%
1954	64,387	+1.87%
1962	70,397	+1.12%
1968	77,251	+1.56%
1975	80,920	+0.67%
1982	80,811	−0.02%
1990	77,206	−0.57%
1999	73,069	−0.61%
2007	75,748	+0.45%
2012	74,176	−0.42%
2017	74,859	+0.18%
2023	76,572	+0.38%

Source: EHESS and INSEE (1968-2023)

=== Immigration ===
Place of birth of residents of Saint-Maur-des-Fossés in 1999
Born in metropolitan France	Born outside metropolitan France			
85.0%	15.0%			
85.0%	Born in overseas France	Born in foreign countries with French citizenship at birth^{1}	EU-15 immigrants^{2}	Non-EU-15 immigrants
85.0%	0.7%	3.6%	5.2%	5.5%
^{1} This group is made up largely of former French settlers, such as pieds-noirs in Northwest Africa, followed by former colonial citizens who had French citizenship at birth (such as was often the case for the native elite in French colonies), as well as to a lesser extent foreign-born children of French expatriates. A foreign country is understood as a country not part of France in 1999, so a person born for example in 1950 in Algeria, when Algeria was an integral part of France, is nonetheless listed as a person born in a foreign country in French statistics.^{2} An immigrant is a person born in a foreign country not having French citizenship at birth. An immigrant may have acquired French citizenship since moving to France, but is still considered an immigrant in French statistics. On the other hand, persons born in France with foreign citizenship (the children of immigrants) are not listed as immigrants.

== Politics ==
Saint-Maur leans to the right in presidential elections, giving François Fillon 33% of its votes in the first round of the 2017 French presidential election.

Election	Winning candidate	Party	%
2022	Emmanuel Macron	EM	76.74
2017	Emmanuel Macron	EM	82.56
2012	Nicolas Sarkozy	UMP	59.76
2007	Nicolas Sarkozy	UMP	64.66
2002	Jacques Chirac	RPR	86.46
1995	Jacques Chirac	RPR	66.90

== Transport ==
Saint-Maur-des-Fossés is served by four stations on Paris RER line A: Saint-Maur – Créteil, Le Parc de Saint-Maur, Champigny, and La Varenne – Chennevières.

Saint-Maur-des-Fossés is also served by many buses, like the TVM (Trans-Val-de-Marne), where Saint-Maur-Créteil is one of the bus termini.

== Education ==
There are 25 public preschools (écoles maternelles) and primary schools in the commune.

Public junior high schools:

- Collège Le Parc
- Collège Rabelais

Public senior high schools:

- Lycée Marcelin Berthelot
- Lycée d'Arsonval
- Lycée Condorcet

Private schools:

- Ensemble scolaire Saint-André (preschool through junior high school)
- Ecole et collège Jeanne D'Arc
- Lycée Teilhard de Chardin

== Culture ==
=== Festivals ===
Saint-Maur-des-Fossés organizes an annual Short Subject Festival.

=== Film and literature ===
Saint-Maur-des-Fossés was the filming location for the old-Paris sections of the 1958 Academy Award winning film Mon Oncle by Jacques Tati. A statue of Tati in character as Monsieur Hulot along with two other characters from the film is visible in the Commune at Place d'Arme.

== Sport ==
The football team US Lusitanos Saint-Maur was founded in 1966 by Portuguese immigrants who worked in a factory in the town. They play their games at the Stade Adolphe-Chéron.

The local handball team Stella Saint-Maur Handball has won the French Men's Championship 6 times between 1968 and 1980 and the Coupe de France once; in 1978. The women's team has also won a single Championship; in 1971.

== Twin towns and sister cities ==
Saint-Maur-des-Fossés is twinned with:

- Ramat HaSharon, Israel
- Bognor Regis, United Kingdom
- Rimini, Italy
- La Louvière, Belgium
- Ziguinchor, Senegal
- Hamelin, Germany
- Leiria, Portugal
- Pforzheim, Germany

== See also ==
- Communes of the Val-de-Marne department
