= Yekaterinburg =

City in Sverdlovsk Oblast, Russia

Yekaterinburg Екатеринбург
- City
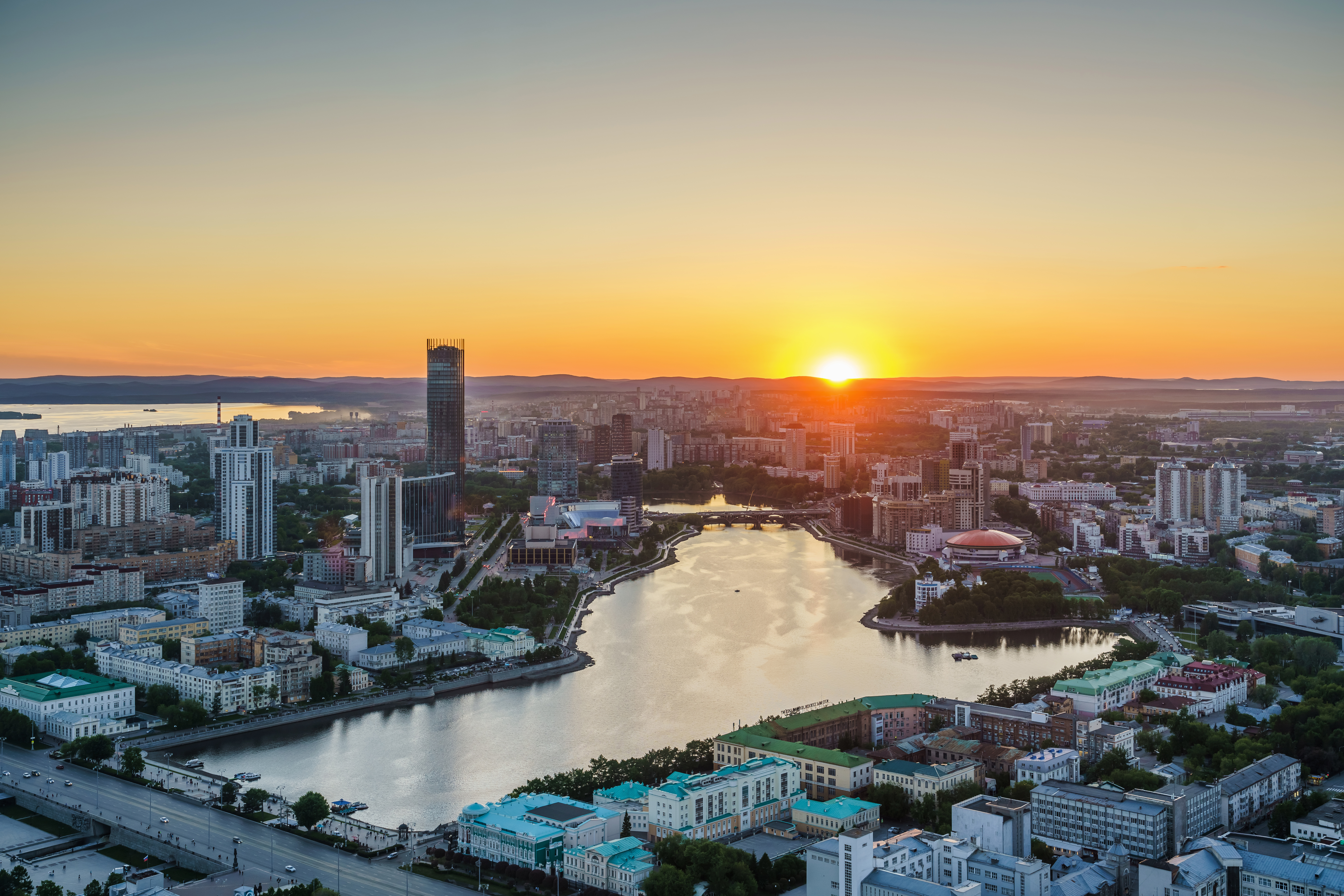
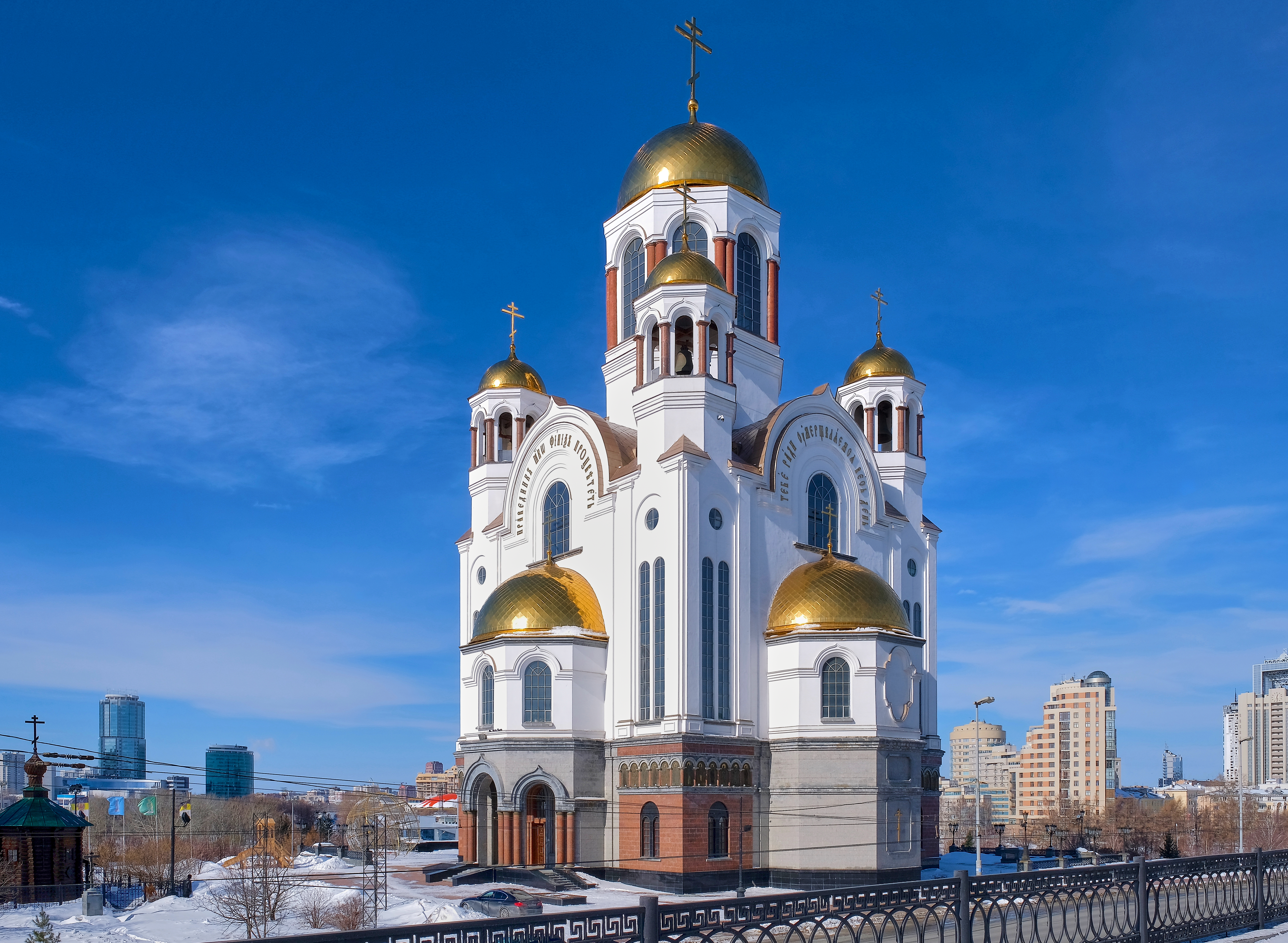
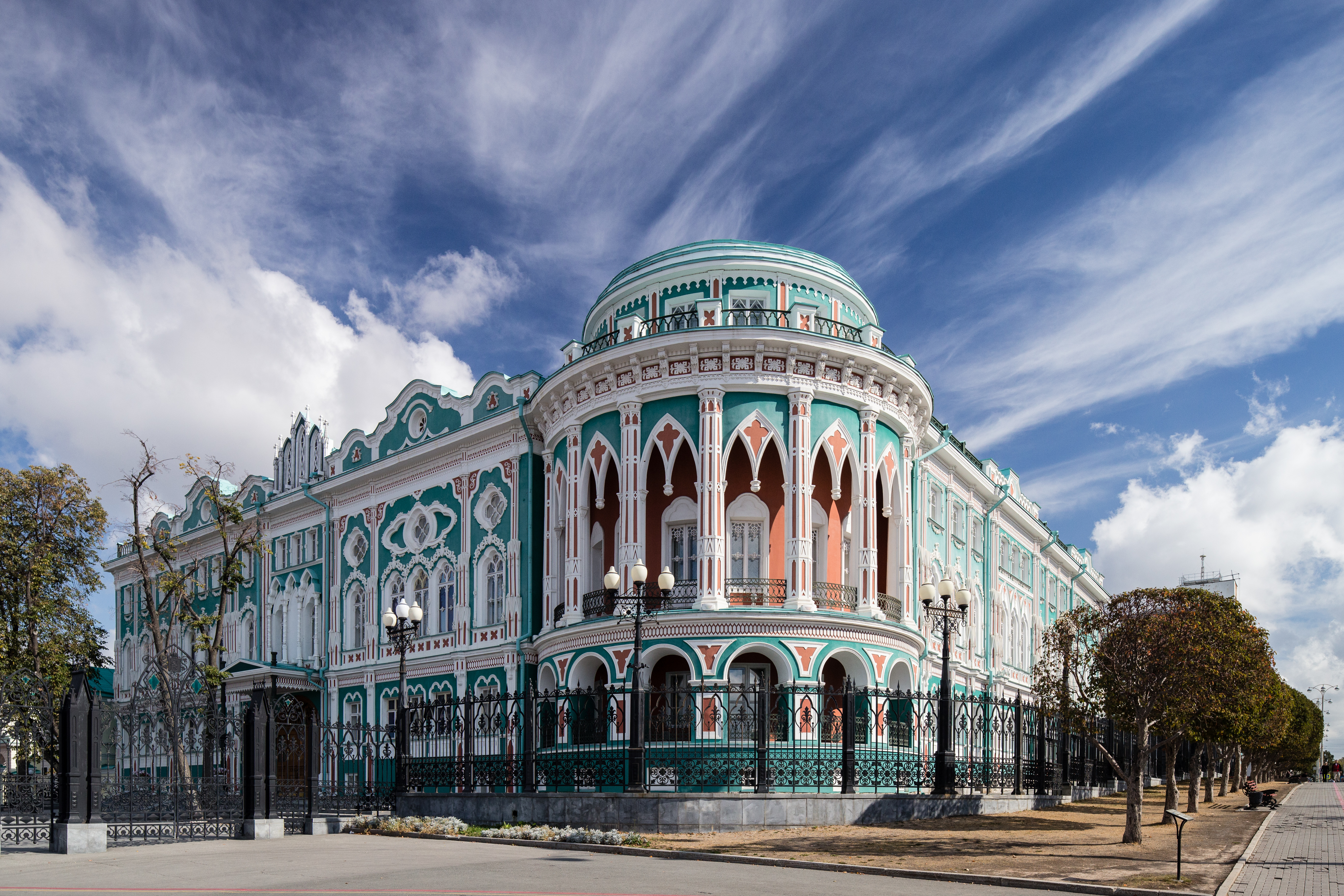
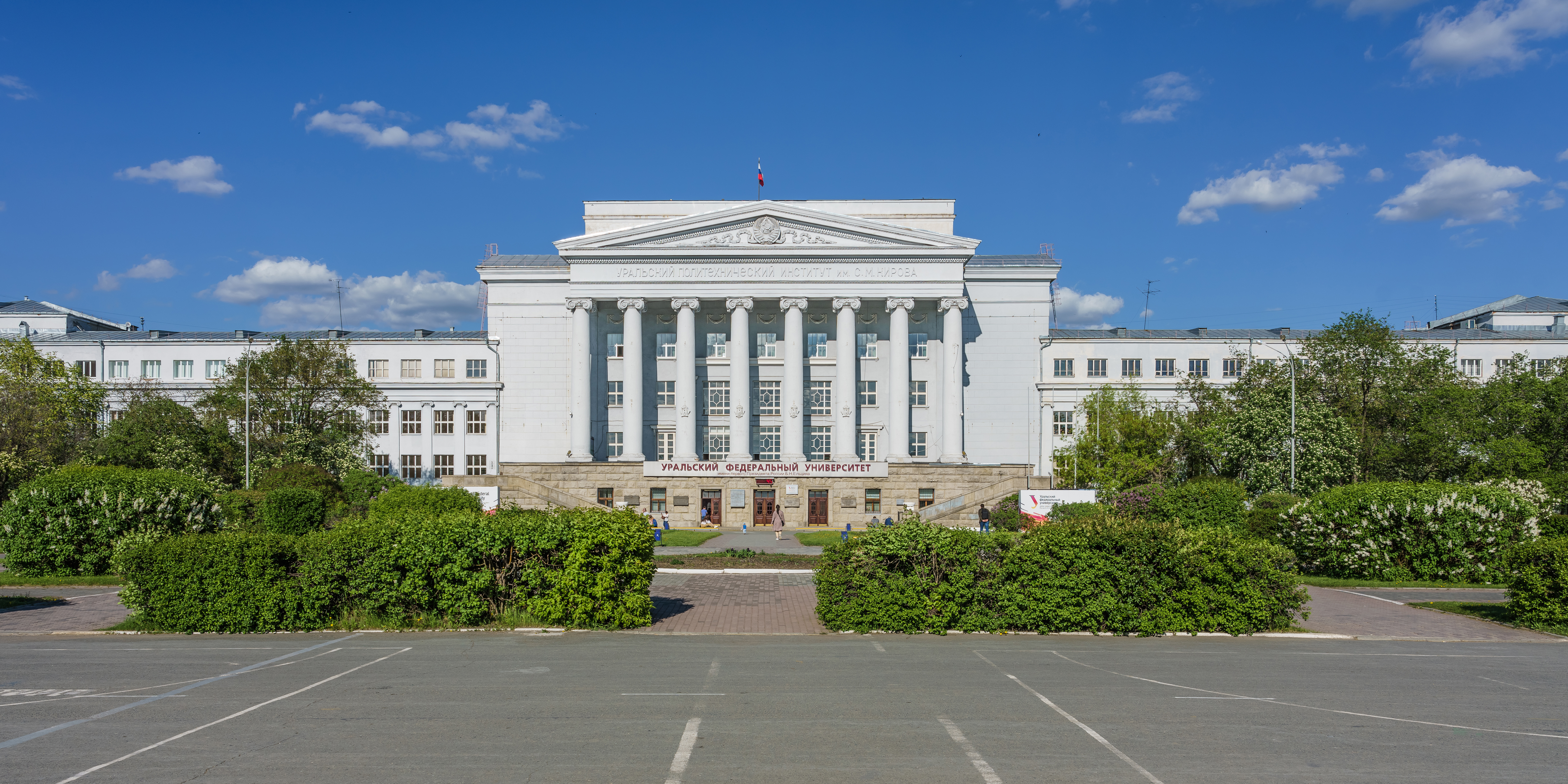
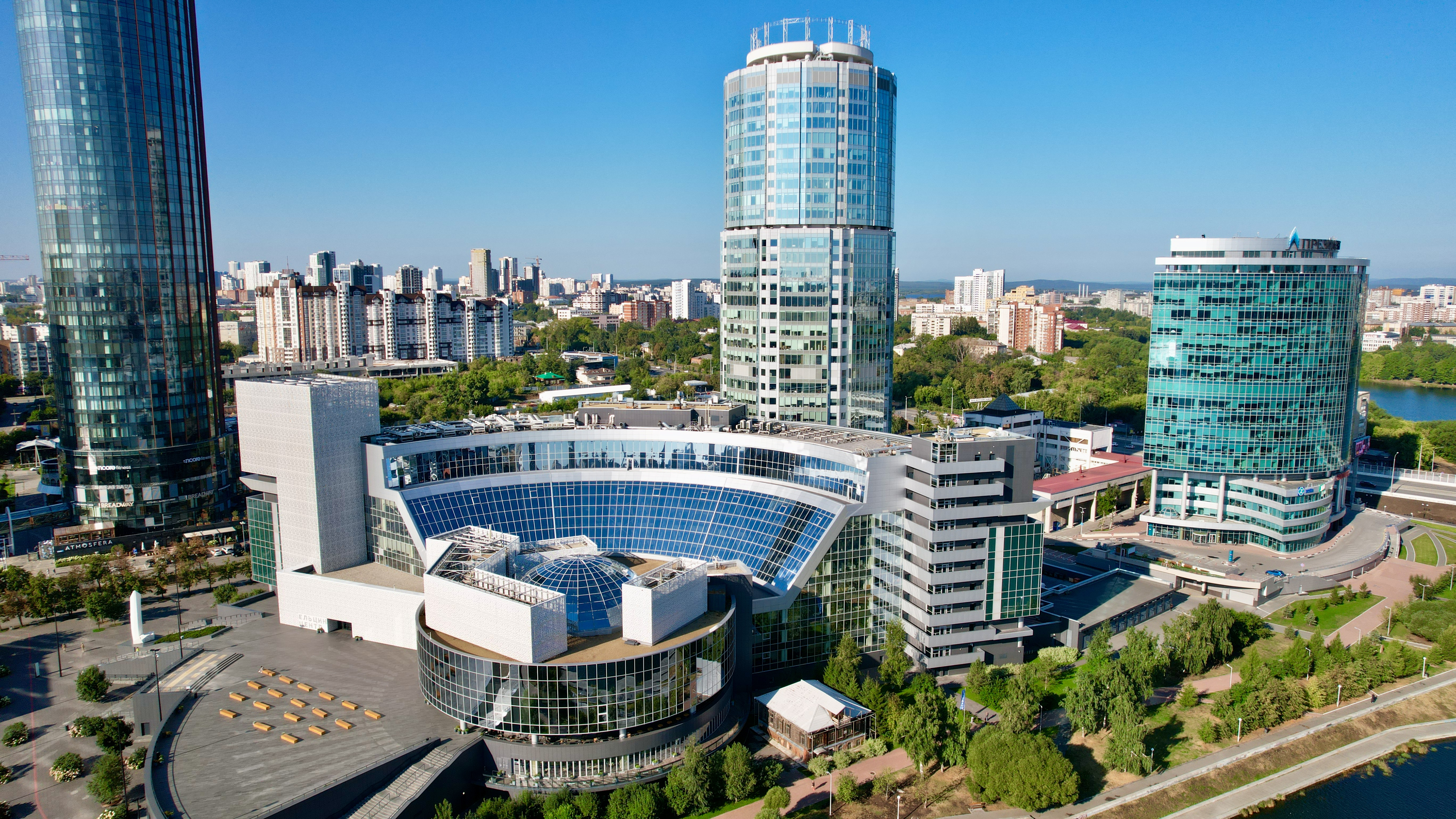
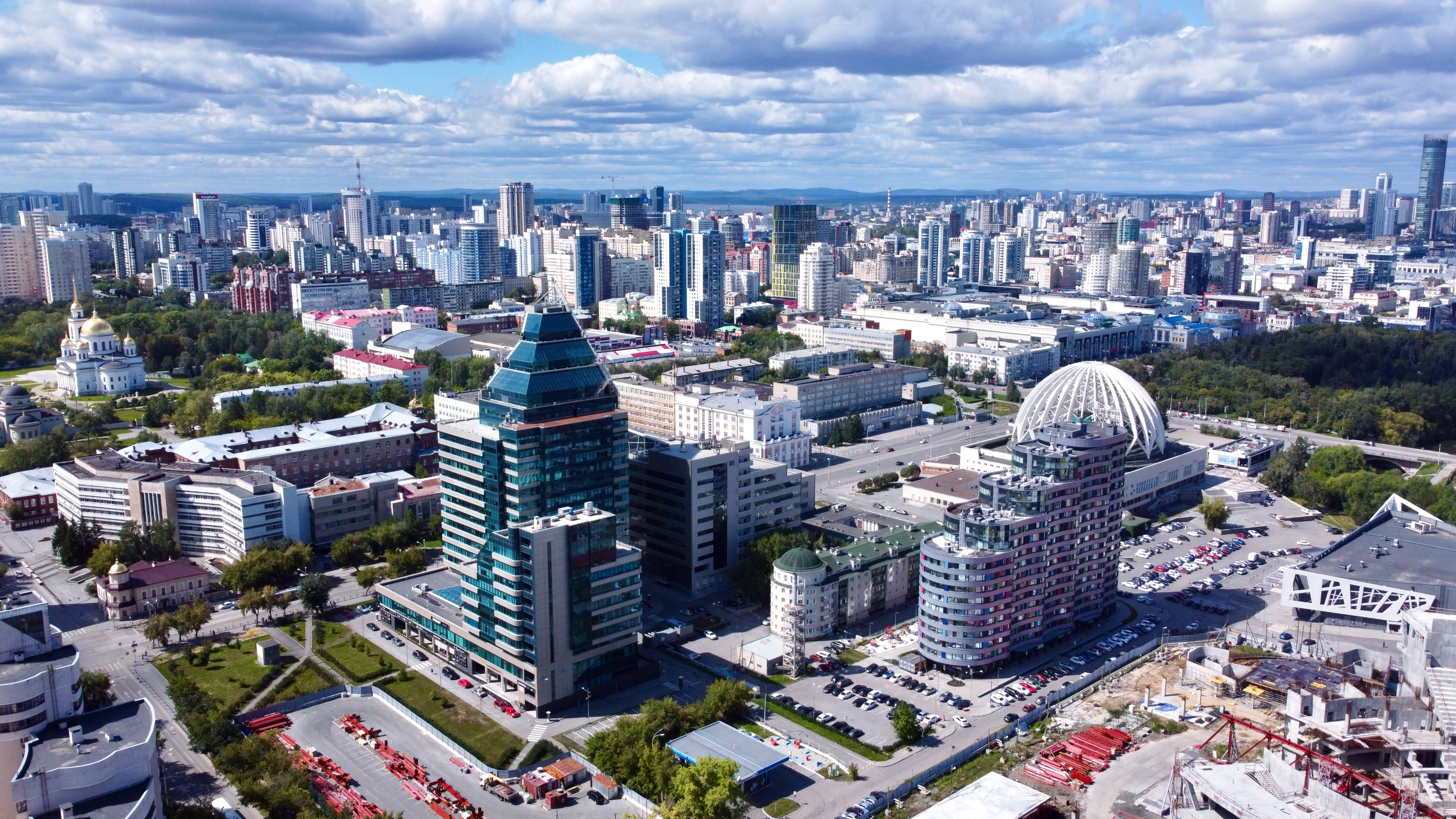
- View of Yekaterinburg-City and the Iset River from Vysotsky Skyscraper Church of All Saints Sevastyanov's house Main building of Ural Federal University Yekaterinburg City Duma Summit Business Center and Yekaterinburg Circus

- Flag Coat of arms
- Interactive map of Yekaterinburg
- Location of Yekaterinburg Yekaterinburg (Sverdlovsk Oblast)
- Coordinates: 56°50′08″N 60°36′46″E
- Country: Russia
- Federal subject: Sverdlovsk Oblast
- Founded: 18 November 1723
- City status since: 1781

Government
  - Body: City Duma
  - Head: Alexey Orlov

Area
  - Total: 1,111 km^{2} (429 sq mi)
- Elevation: 237 m (778 ft)

Population (2010 Census)
  - Total: 1,349,772
  - Estimate (2024): 1,536,183 (+13.8%)
  - Rank: 4th in 2010
  - Density: 1,215/km^{2} (3,147/sq mi)

Administrative status
  - Subordinated to: City of Yekaterinburg
  - Capital of: Sverdlovsk Oblast, City of Yekaterinburg

Municipal status
  - Urban okrug: Yekaterinburg Urban Okrug
  - Capital of: Yekaterinburg Urban Okrug
- Time zone: UTC+5 (MSK+2)
- Postal code: 620000
- Dialing code: +7 343
- OKTMO ID: 65701000001
- City Day: 3rd Saturday of August
- Website: екатеринбург.рф

Yekaterinburg, (Note: /jɪˈkætərɪnbɜːrɡ/ yih-KAT-ər-in-burg; Russian: Екатеринбург, IPA: [jɪkətʲɪrʲɪnˈburk]) alternatively transliterated as Ekaterinburg, and formerly known as Sverdlovsk (1924–1991), (Note: Свердловск IPA: [svʲɪrˈdlofsk]) is the administrative centre and largest city of Sverdlovsk Oblast and the Ural Federal District, Russia. The city is located on the Iset River between the Volga-Ural region and Siberia, with a population of roughly 1.5 million residents, up to 2.2 million residents in the urban agglomeration. Yekaterinburg is the fourth most populous city in Russia, the largest city in the Ural Federal District, and one of Russia's main cultural and industrial centres. Yekaterinburg has been dubbed the "third capital of Russia", as it is ranked third by the size of its economy, culture, transportation and tourism, behind Moscow and Saint Petersburg.

Yekaterinburg was founded on 18 November 1723 and named after Catherine, the wife of Russian emperor Peter the Great. The city served as the mining capital of the Russian Empire as well as a strategic connection between Europe and Asia. In 1781, Catherine the Great gave Yekaterinburg the status of a district town of Perm Province, and built the historical Siberian Route through the city. Yekaterinburg became a key city to Siberia, which had rich resources.

In the late 19th century, Yekaterinburg became one of the centres of revolutionary movements in the Urals. During the Russian Civil War, it was the site of the murder of the Romanov family. In 1924, after the Russian SFSR founded the Soviet Union, the city was renamed Sverdlovsk after the Bolshevik leader Yakov Sverdlov. During the Soviet era, a tram network was completed in 1929 and Sverdlovsk and its surroundings were turned into a heavy industry powerhouse. The Sverdlovsk Metro opened in April 1991, and in September 1991 the city returned to its historical name.

Yekaterinburg is one of Russia's most important economic centres and was one of the host cities of the 2018 FIFA World Cup. In the 21st century, the city has experienced an economic and population boom, which resulted in some of the tallest skyscrapers of Russia being located in the city. Yekaterinburg is home to the headquarters of the Central Military District of the Russian Armed Forces, as well as the presidium of the Ural Branch of the Russian Academy of Sciences.

Yekaterinburg's downtown on the Iset embankment

Yekaterinburg is famous for its constructivist architecture, and is also considered the "Russian capital of street art".

== History ==
=== Prehistory ===
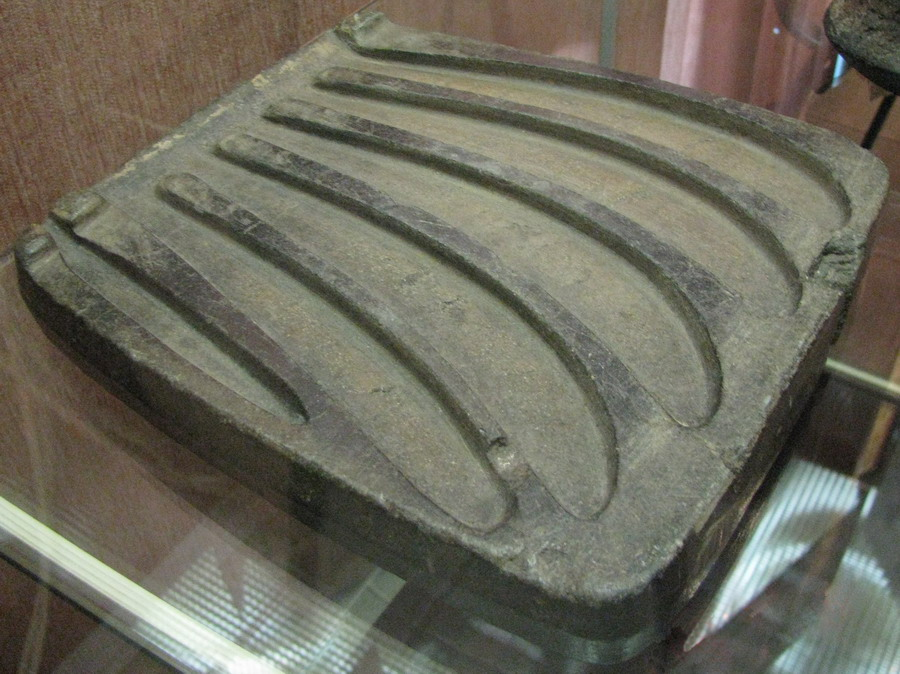
Bronze Age 5-sickle casting mold, Sverdlovsk Regional Museum of Local Lore

The area was settled in prehistory. The earliest settlements date to 8000–7000 BC, in the Mesolithic period. The Isetskoe Pravoberezhnoye I archaeological site contains a Neolithic settlement dated to 6000–5000 BC. It includes stone processing workshops with artefacts such as grinding plates, anvils, clumps of rock, tools, and finished products. Over 50 different types of rock and minerals were used in tool making, indicating extensive knowledge of the region's natural resources. The Gamayun peninsula (left bank of the Verkh-Isetsky Pond) has archaeological findings from the Chalcolithic Period: workshops for producing stone tools (upper area) and two dwellings of the Ayat culture (lower area). There are also traces of the Koptyak culture from 2000 BC: dishes decorated with bird images and evidence of metallurgical production. The Tent I site contains the only Koptyak culture burials discovered in the Ural Mountains. In the Bronze Age, the people of Gamayun culture lived in the area. They left fragments of ceramics, weapons, and ornaments.

Archaeological artifacts in the vicinity of Yekaterinburg were first discovered during railway construction, at the end of the 19th century. Excavation and research began in the 20th century. Artifacts are held at the Sverdlovsk Regional Museum of Local Lore, at the Hermitage, at the Museum of Anthropology and Ethnography of the Academy of Sciences, and at other museums.

=== Imperial era ===
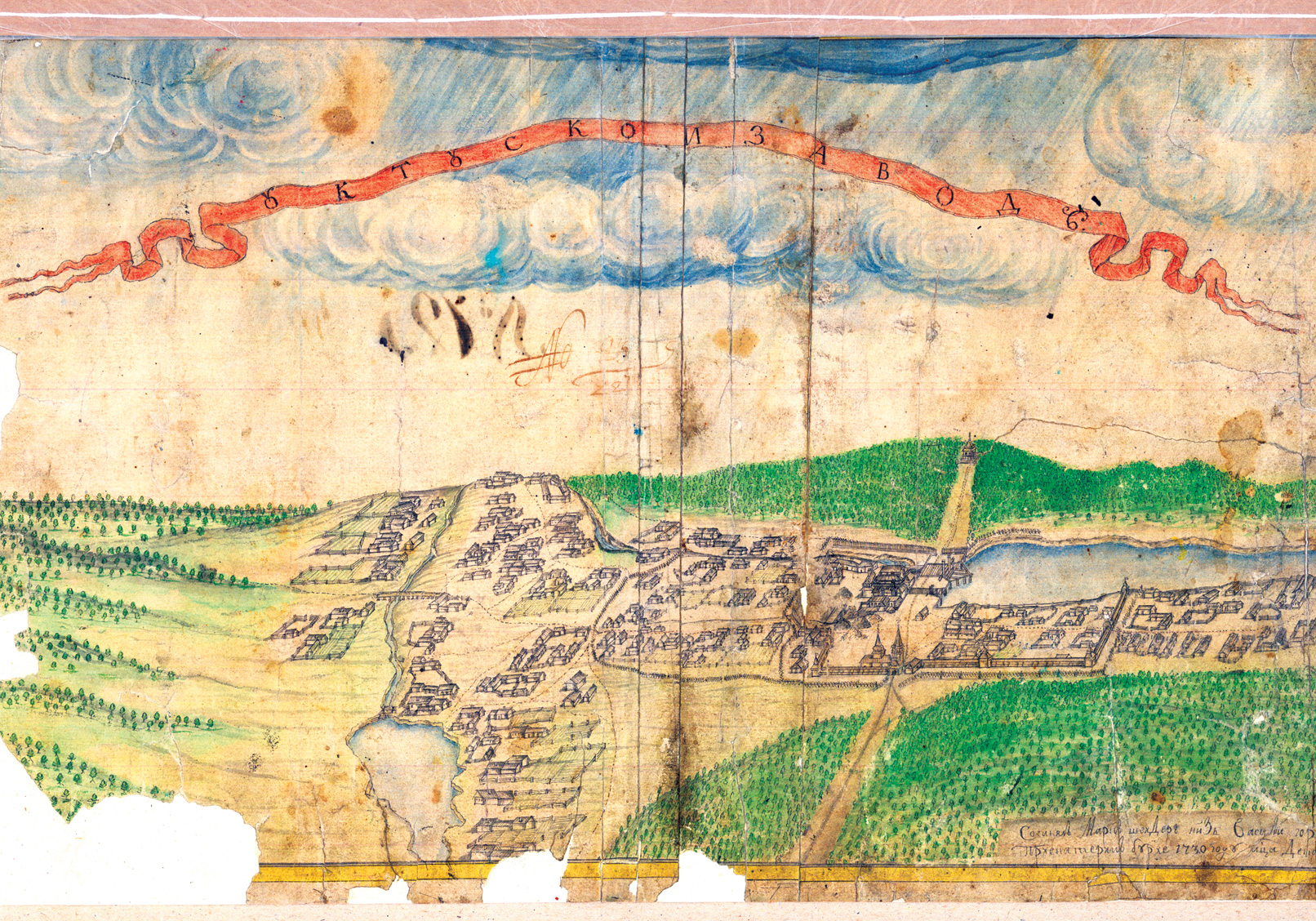
Uktus plant, 1730

The first Russian settlements within the boundaries of modern Yekaterinburg appeared in the second half of the 17th century — in 1672, an Old Believers village arose in the area of Shartash lake (this fact is disputed by historians, since no evidence of the founding of the village at that time was found in the sources), and in 1680–1682, the villages of Nizhny and Verkhny Uktus appeared on the banks of Uktus River (now the territory of the Chkalovsky district of the city). In 1702, by the initiative of the head of Sibirskiy prikaz Andrew Vinius, the Uktus state ironwork plant was founded near Nizhny Uktus — the first ironworks within the boundaries of modern Yekaterinburg. In 1704, the Shuvakish ironworks was built (now the territory of the Zheleznodorozhny district of the city). With the beginning of active construction of factories in the Urals in the 18th century, relations with their southern neighbors, the Bashkirs, became strained. As a result of the Bashkir raid in 1709, the village of Verkhny Uktus was devastated, all buildings, including the wooden church and chapel, were burned, the residents fled to the protection of the Uktus plant fortifications. On the night of 5 April 1718, a fire destroyed all the factory buildings of the Uktus plant, except for the dam, and the plant was restored only by 1720 under the supervision of Timofey Burtsev. However, the plant did not receive further development due to the lack of water in Uktus river.

In 1720, by decree of Peter I, a delegation led by mining specialist Johann Blüher and statesman Vasily Tatishchev was sent to the Urals. They were entrusted with managing the mining industry, identifying the causes of the collapse and reduction of production at state-owned factories. On 29 December 1720, Tatishchev and Blüher arrive at the Uktus plant, which became their main residence in the Urals. As a result of familiarizing himself with the state of nearby state-owned factories, Tatishchev came to the conclusion that on the basis of these factories, even if they were reconstructed and expanded, it would not be possible to quickly increase the production of iron, and it would be more profitable to build a new large plant. After inspecting the immediate area, together with the commissary of the Uktus plant, Timofey Burtsev, a place rich in ore and forest was chosen on the banks of the more full-flowing Iset River, 7 versts from Uktus. On 6 February 1721, Tatishchev sent a message to the Collegium of Mining, in which he asked permission to begin construction of the plant, with detailed explanations and justification for this project. On 1 March 1721, without waiting for a response from the Collegium, Tatishchev began construction of the new plant, but he failed to convince Collegium, and by the Collegium decree of 10 December 1721, he was removed from the leadership of mining affairs in the Urals. In 1722, by decree of Peter the Great, a mining engineer, Major General Georg Wilhelm de Gennin, was sent to the Urals in place of Tatishchev. Having studied all the circumstances, de Gennin fully supported Tatishchev’s project, and on 12 March 1723, construction of the plant on Iset resumed.

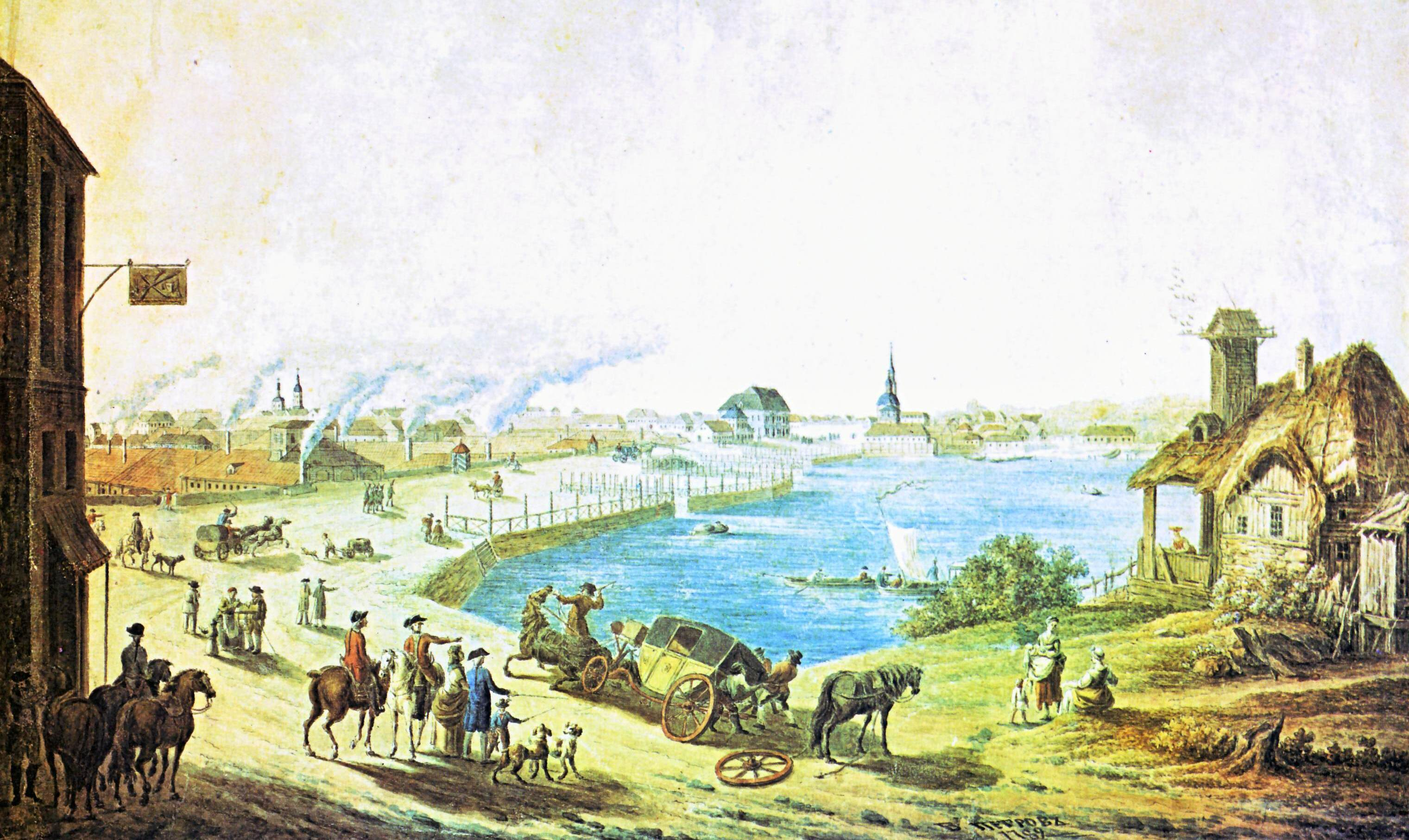
Yekaterinburg, 1789

Russian historian Vasily Tatishchev and Russian engineer Georg Wilhelm de Gennin founded Yekaterinburg with the construction of a massive iron-making plant under the decree of Russian emperor Peter the Great in 1723. They named the city after the emperor's wife, Yekaterina, who later became empress regnant Catherine I. Officially, the city's founding date is 18 November 1723, when the shops carried out a test run of the bloomery for trip hammers. The plant was commissioned 6 days later, on 24 November. 1723 also saw the establishment of Yekaterinburg fortress, which would encompass many of the settlement's earliest buildings. Dmitry Mamin-Sibiryak very vividly described the beginning of the construction of a mining plant and a fortress: "Imagine completely deserted banks of the Iset river, covered with forest. In the spring of 1723, soldiers from Tobolsk, peasants of the assigned settlements, hired craftsmen appeared, and everything around came to life, as if by the dictates of a fairy tale. They dropped the forest, prepared a place for the dam, laid blast furnaces, raised the rampart, set up barracks and houses for the authorities... ".

In 1722–1726 the Verkhne-Uktussky mining plant was built, which was officially called the plant of the princess Elizabeth (the future village of Elizabeth, or Elizavetinskoe) and became a part of modern Yekaterinburg in 1934. In 1726, Wilhelm de Gennin founded an auxiliary Verkh-Isetsky plant with a working settlement 2 versts from Yekaterinburg upstream ('verkh' in Russian) the Iset River. The plant's dam formed the Verkh-Isetsky pond. Colloquially called by the Russian acronym VIZ, it was a satellite town until in 1926, with a population of over 20,000 people by this time, it was incorporated into Yekaterinburg as the core of the Verkh-Isetsky district.

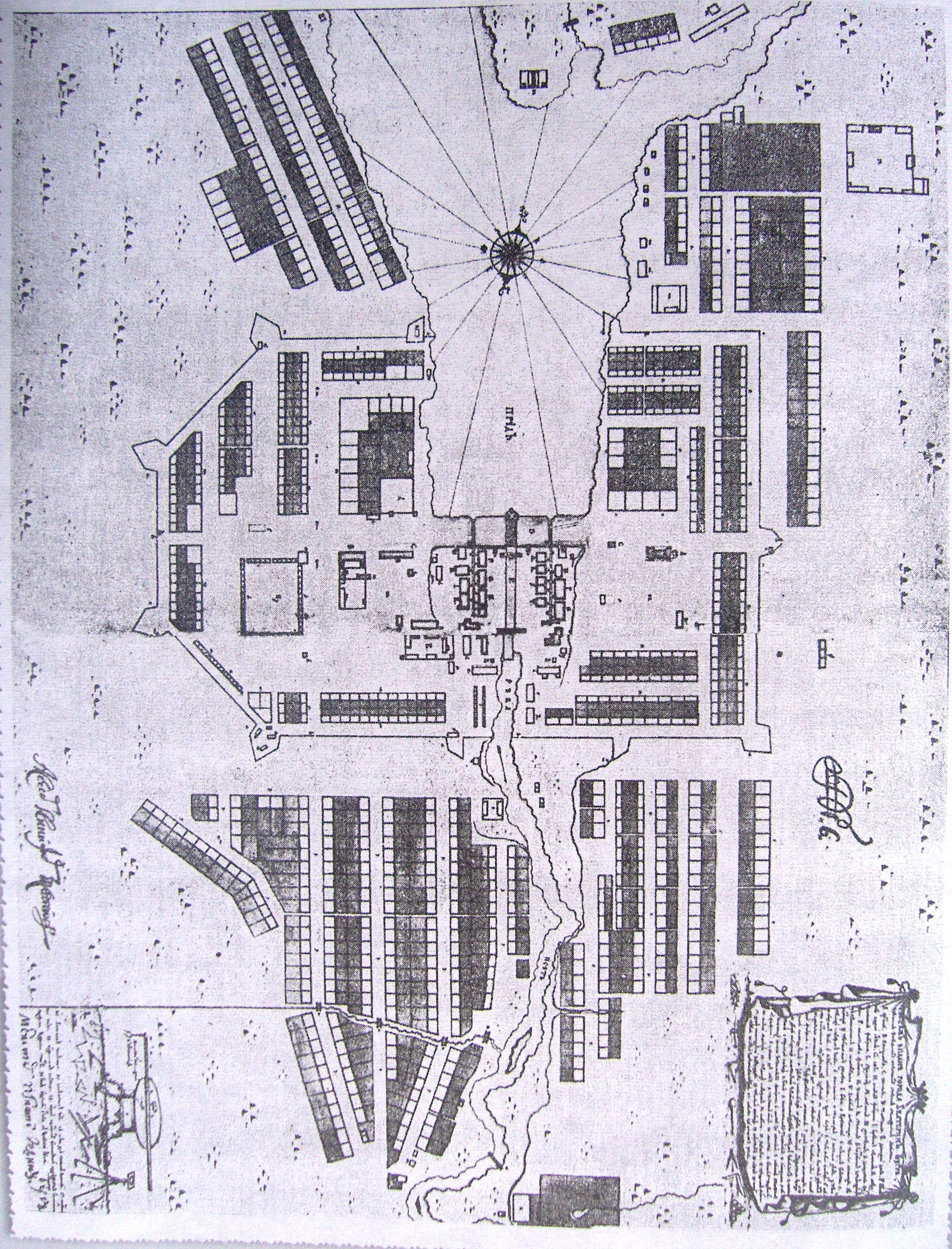
Plan of Yekaterinburg, 1743

Yekaterinburg was one of the industrial cities of Russia prompted at the beginning of the 18th century by decrees of Tsar Peter the Great which demanded the development of the metalworking industry. With extensive use of iron, the city was built to a regular square plan with ironworks and residential buildings at the centre. These were surrounded by fortified walls so that Yekaterinburg was at the same time both a manufacturing centre and a fortress at the frontier between Europe and Asia. It, therefore, found itself at the heart of Russia's strategy for further development of the entire Ural region. The so-called Siberian Route became operational in 1763 and placed the city on an increasingly important transit route, which led to its development as a focus of trade and commerce between east and west, and gave rise to the description of the city as the "window to Asia". With the growth in trade and the city's administrative importance, the ironworks became less critical, and the more important buildings were increasingly built using expensive stone. Small manufacturing and trading businesses proliferated. In 1781 Russia's empress, Catherine the Great, granted Yekaterinburg town status and nominated it as the administrative centre for the wider region within Perm Governorate. In 1807, the role of the capital of the mining and smelting region was confirmed by assigning it the status of the only "mountain city" in Russia, under which Yekaterinburg remained subordinate to the head of the mining plants of the Ural ridge, the minister of finance, and personally to the emperor until 1863, enjoying considerable freedom from the governor's power. Since the 1830s, mountainous Yekaterinburg has become the center of mechanical engineering.

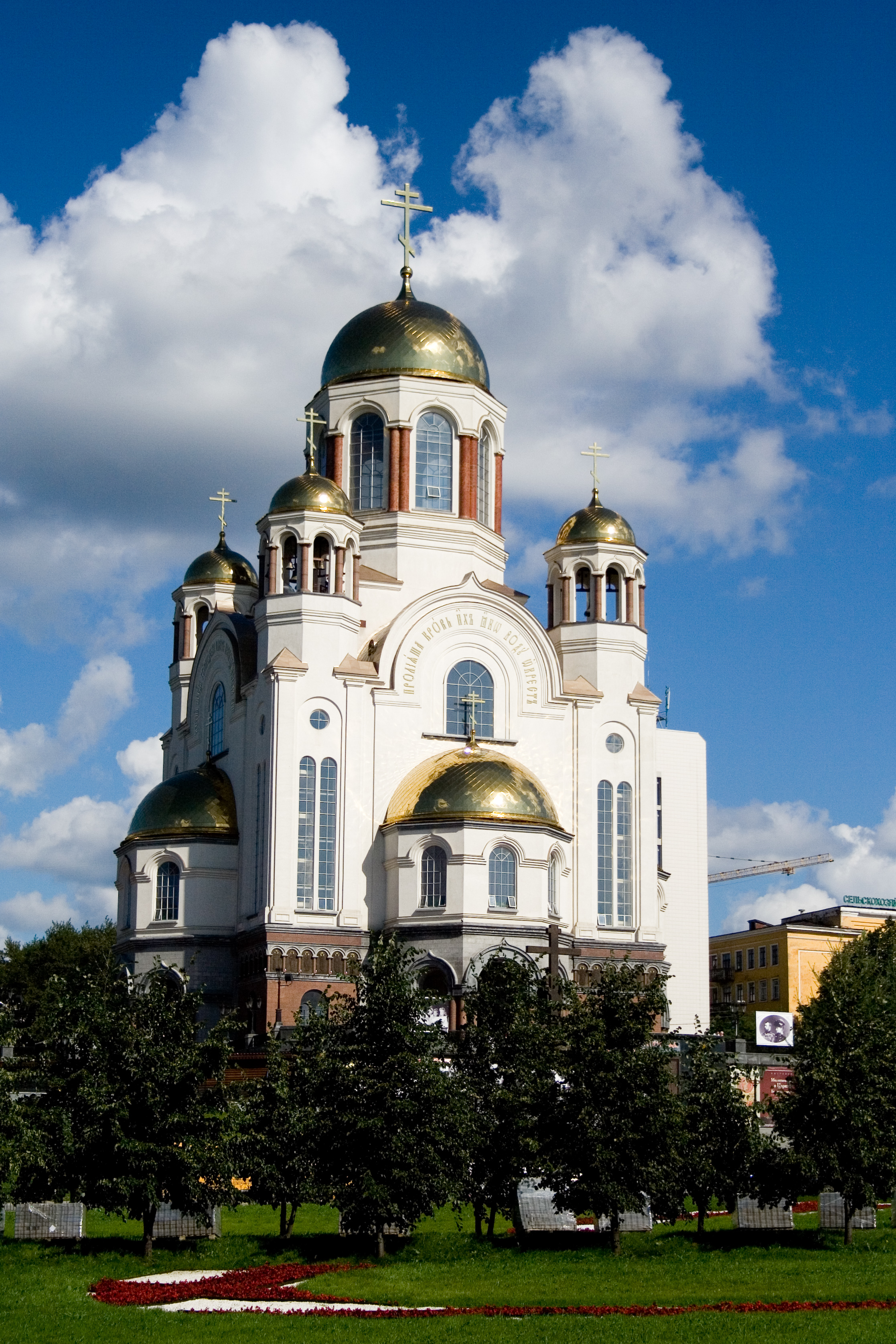
Cathedral on the Blood stands on the site of the Ipatiev House, where the Romanovs — the last royal family of Russia — were murdered

In 1820–1845, 45% of the world's gold was mined in Yekaterinburg. Until 1876, 80% of the coins in circulation in the Russian Empire were produced at the Yekaterinburg Mint.

Following the October Revolution, the family of deposed Tsar Nicholas II was sent to internal exile in Yekaterinburg where they were imprisoned in the Ipatiev House in the city. In July 1918, the Czechoslovak Legions were closing on Yekaterinburg. In the early hours of the morning of 17 July, the deposed Tsar, his wife Alexandra, and their children Grand Duchesses Olga, Tatiana, Maria, Anastasia, and Tsarevich Alexei were murdered by the Bolsheviks at the Ipatiev House. Other members of the Romanov family were killed at Alapayevsk later the same day. The Legions arrived less than a week later and captured the city. The city remained under the control of the White movement in which a provisional government was established. The Red Army took back the city and restored Soviet authority on 14 July 1919.

=== Soviet era ===
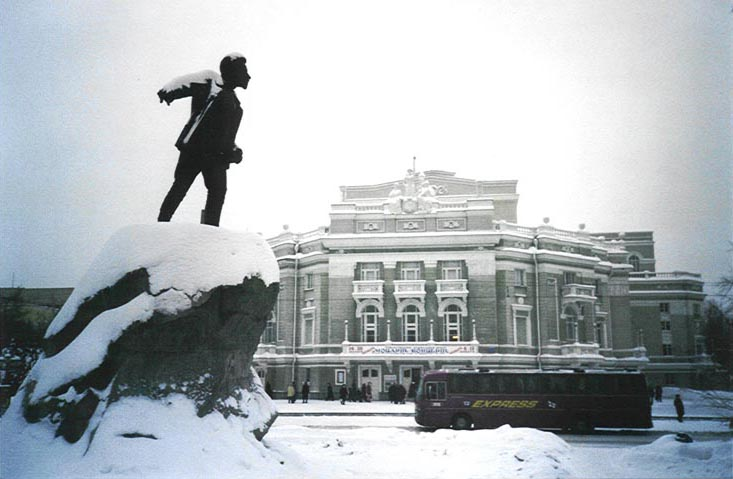
Snow-covered statue of Yakov Sverdlov

In the years following the Russian Revolution and the Russian Civil War, political authority of the Urals was transferred from Perm to Yekaterinburg. On 19 October 1920, Yekaterinburg established its first university, the Ural State University, as well as polytechnic, pedagogical, and medical institutions under the decree of Soviet leader Vladimir Lenin. Enterprises in the city ravaged by the war were nationalised, including: the Metalist (formerly Yates) Plant, the Verkh-Isetsky (formerly Yakovleva) Plant, and the Lenin flax-spinning factory (formerly Makarov). In 1924, the city of Yekaterinburg was renamed Sverdlovsk after the Bolshevik leader Yakov Sverdlov.

By 1934, following an extended series of administrative reforms under the early Soviet government, Yekaterinburg incorporated various small surrounding settlements, including those that predated the city and formed its historical basis, as well as those established later.

During the reign of Stalin, Sverdlovsk was one of several places developed by the Soviet government as a centre of heavy industry. Old factories were reconstructed and new large factories were built, especially those specialised in machine-building and metalworking. These plants included Magnitogorsk and the Chelyabinsk Tractor Plant in Chelyabinsk oblast, and Uralmash in Sverdlovsk. During this time, the population of Sverdlovsk tripled in size, and it became one of the fastest-growing cities of the Soviet Union. At that time, very large powers were given to the regional authorities. By the end of the 1930s, there were 140 industrial enterprises, 25 research institutes, and 12 higher education institutions in Sverdlovsk.

During World War II, the city became the headquarters of the Ural Military District on the basis of which more than 500 different military units and formations were formed, including the 22nd Army and the Ural Volunteer Tank Corps. Uralmash became the main production site for armoured vehicles. Many state technical institutions and whole factories were relocated to Sverdlovsk away from cities affected by war (mostly Moscow), with many of them staying in Sverdlovsk after the victory. The Hermitage Museum collections were also partly evacuated from Leningrad to Sverdlovsk in July 1941 and remained there until October 1945. In the postwar years, new industrial and agricultural enterprises were put into operation and massive housing construction began. The lookalike five-story apartment blocks that remain today in Kirovsky, Chkalovsky, and other residential areas of Sverdlovsk sprang up in the 1960s, under the direction of Nikita Khrushchev's government. In 1977, Ipatiev House was demolished by order of Boris Yeltsin in accordance to a resolution from the Politburo in order to prevent it from being used as a rallying location for monarchists. Yeltsin later became the first president of Russia and represented the people at the funeral of the former Tsar in 1998. There was an anthrax outbreak in Sverdlovsk in April and May 1979, which was attributed to a release from the Sverdlovsk-19 military facility.

=== Contemporary era ===
During the 1991 coup d'état attempt, Sverdlovsk, the home city of President Boris Yeltsin, was selected by him as a temporary reserve capital for the Russian Federation, in case Moscow became too dangerous for the Russian government. A reserve cabinet headed by Oleg Lobov was sent to the city, where Yeltsin enjoyed strong popular support at that time. Shortly after the failure of the coup and subsequent dissolution of the Soviet Union, the city regained its historical name of Yekaterinburg on 23 September 1991. However, Sverdlovsk Oblast, of which Yekaterinburg is the administrative centre, kept its name.

In the 2000s, an intensive growth of trade, business, and tourism began in Yekaterinburg. In 2003, Russian president Vladimir Putin and German chancellor Gerhard Schröder negotiated in Yekaterinburg. On 15–17 June 2009, the SCO and BRIC summits were held in Yekaterinburg, which greatly improved the economic, cultural, and tourist situation in the city. On 13–16 July 2010, a meeting between Russian president Dmitry Medvedev and German chancellor Angela Merkel took place in the city.

The same period also transformed Yekaterinburg’s skyline. The Vysotsky Business Center, begun in 2006 and completed in 2011, was the city’s first skyscraper. It stands 188.3 m with 54 floors and houses offices, a hotel, restaurants, a museum, and a 52nd-floor observation deck. It cost about $150 million and was designed by Andrey Molokov and Vladimir Grachev.

The Iset Tower, part of the Yekaterinburg-City district, was begun in 2008, with major work beginning in 2010, and was completed in 2015–2016. Designed by Werner Sobek, it has 52 floors, reaches 209 m, and contains mainly apartments. In March 2018, after the unfinished TV Tower was demolished, it became the city’s tallest building.

In 2018, Yekaterinburg hosted four matches of the 2018 FIFA World Cup and hosted the inaugural University International Sports Festival in 2023.

As of 2026, Iset Tower remains the tallest in Yekaterinburg and the Ural Federal District, with Vysotsky second. Construction of the 75-story Parus tower, planned to approach 300 m, began in 2026 and is scheduled for completion by 2031.

== Geography ==
=== Location ===
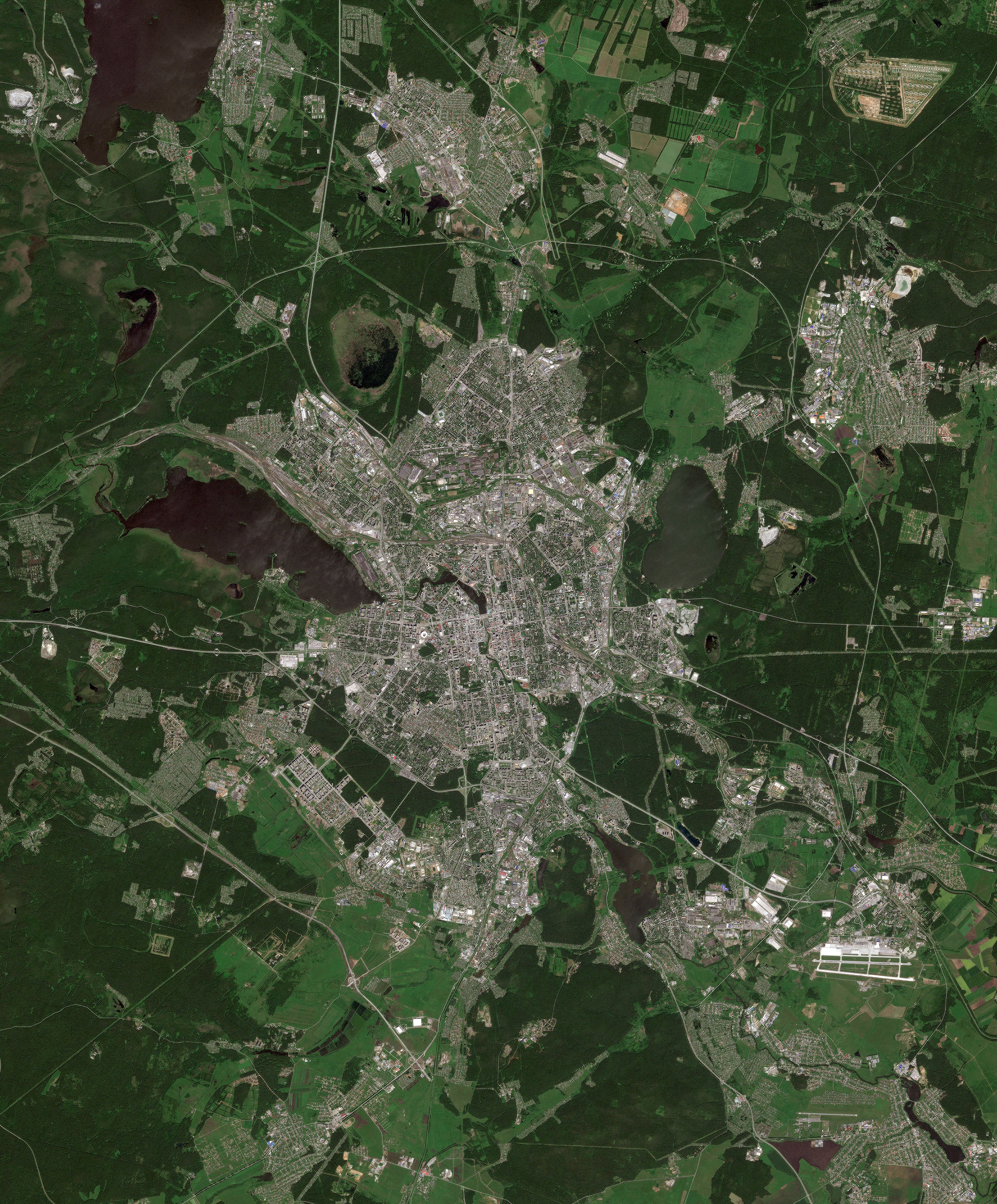
Yekaterinburg City and vicinities, satellite image of ESA Sentinel-2

Geographically, Yekaterinburg is in North Asia, close to the Ural Mountains (which divide Europe from Asia), 1,667 km (1,036 mi) east of the nation's capital Moscow.

The city has a total area of 1,111 km^{2} (429 sq mi).

Yekaterinburg is on the eastern side of the Urals. The city is surrounded by wooded hills, partially cultivated for agricultural purposes. Yekaterinburg is located on a natural watershed, so there would be many bodies of water close and in the city. The city is bisected by the Iset River, which flows from the Urals into the Tobol River. There are two lakes in the city, Lake Shuvakish and Lake Shartash. The city borders Verkh-Isetskiy Pond, through which the Iset River flows. Lake Isetskoye and Lake Baltym are both near the city, with Lake Isetskoye located near Sredneuralsk, and Lake Baltym located near the towns of Sanatornyy and Baltym.

=== Time ===
Yekaterinburg uses Yekaterinburg Time, which is five hours ahead of UTC (UTC+5), and two hours ahead of Moscow Time.

=== Climate ===
The city possesses a humid continental climate (Dfb) under the Köppen climate classification, featuring warm summers and cold winters. It is characterised by sharp variability in weather conditions, with well-marked seasons. The Ural Mountains, despite their insignificant height, block air from the west, from the European part of Russia. As a result, the Central Urals are open to the invasion of cold arctic air and continental air from the West Siberian Plain. Equally, warm air masses from the Caspian Sea and the deserts of Central Asia can freely penetrate from the south. Therefore, the weather in Yekaterinburg is characterised by sharp temperature fluctuations and weather anomalies: in winter, from frost at −40 °C to thaw and rain; in summer, from frosts to temperatures above 35 °C (95 °F).

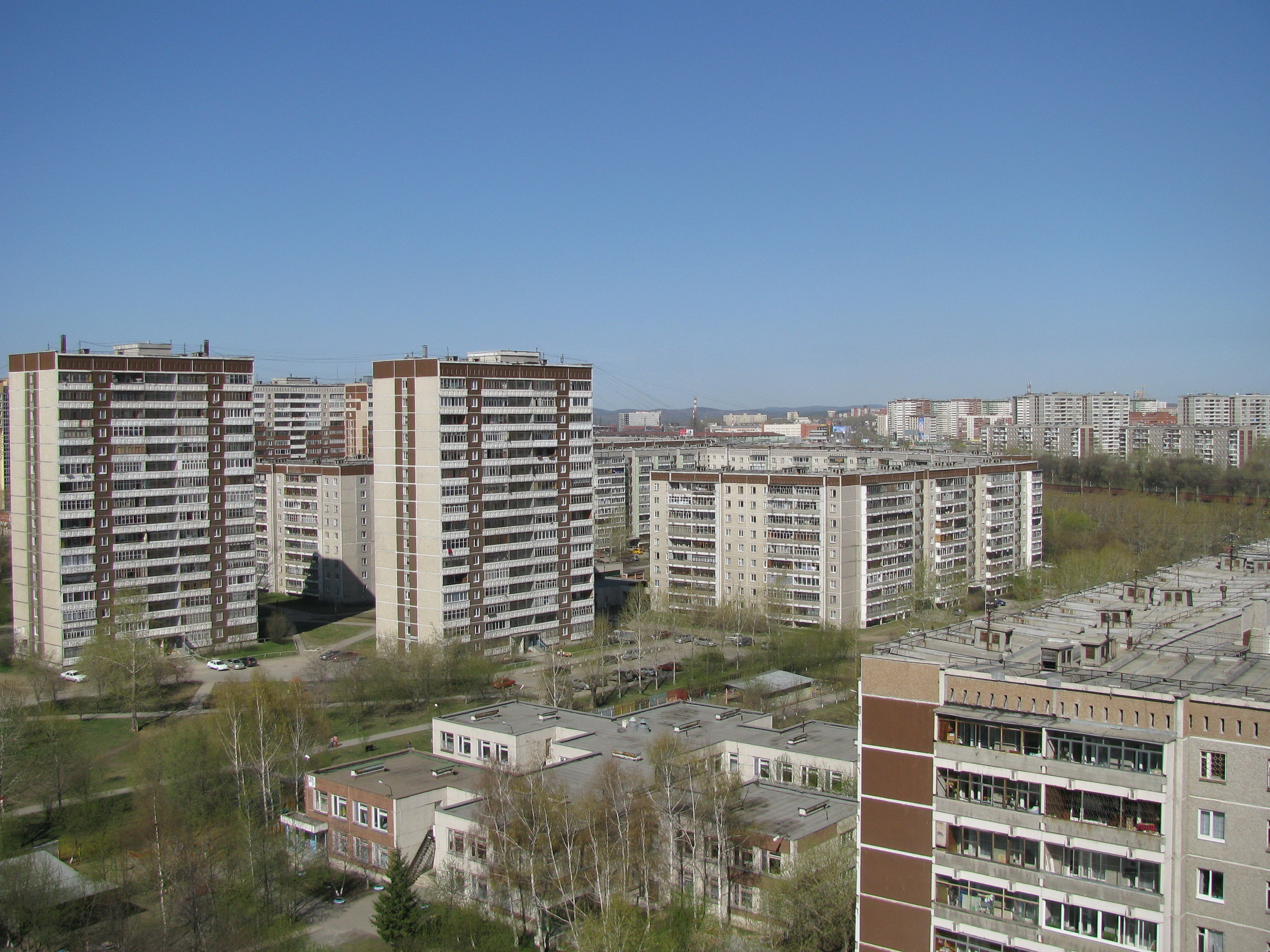
Spring in Yekaterinburg

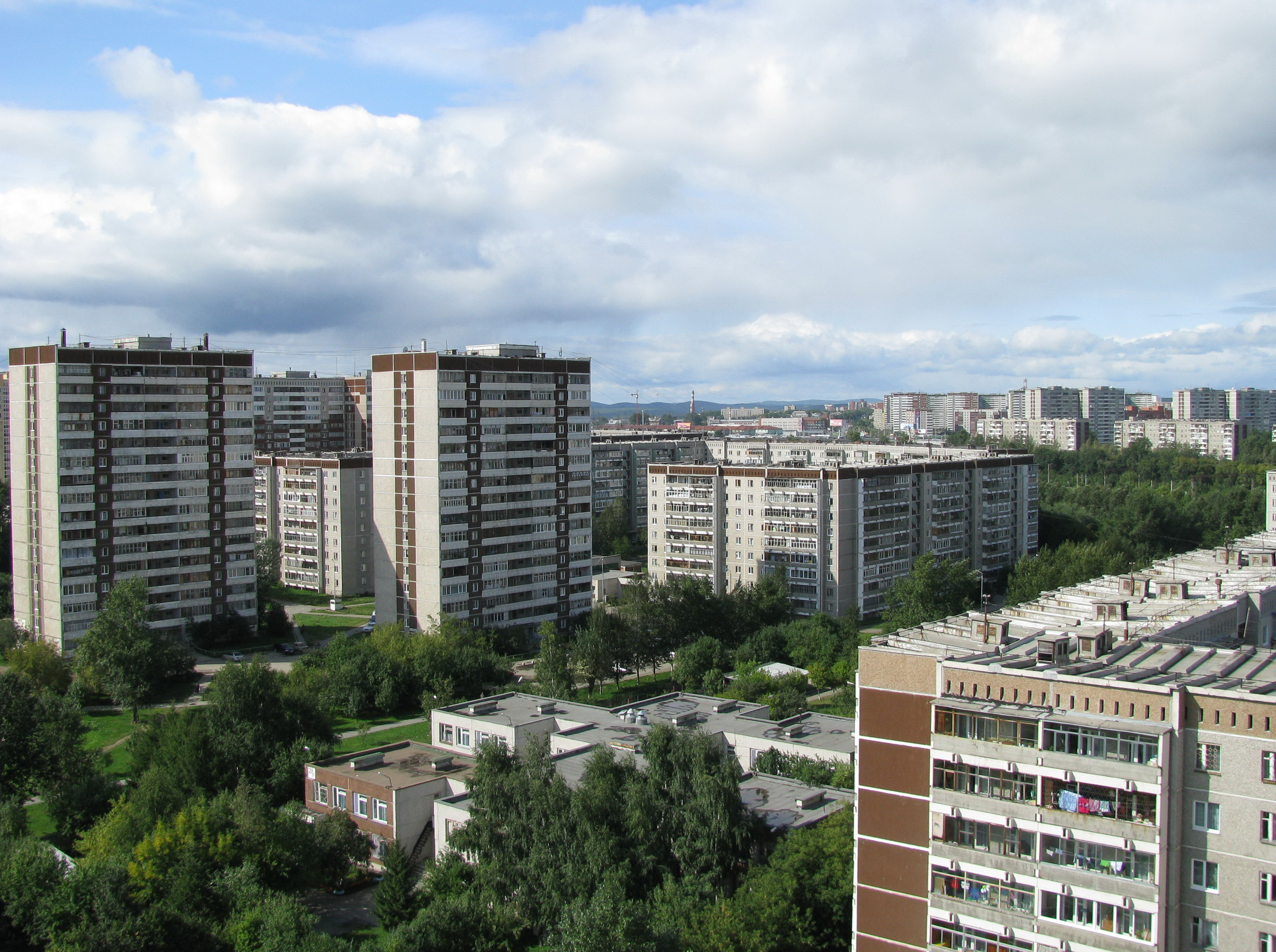
Summer in Yekaterinburg

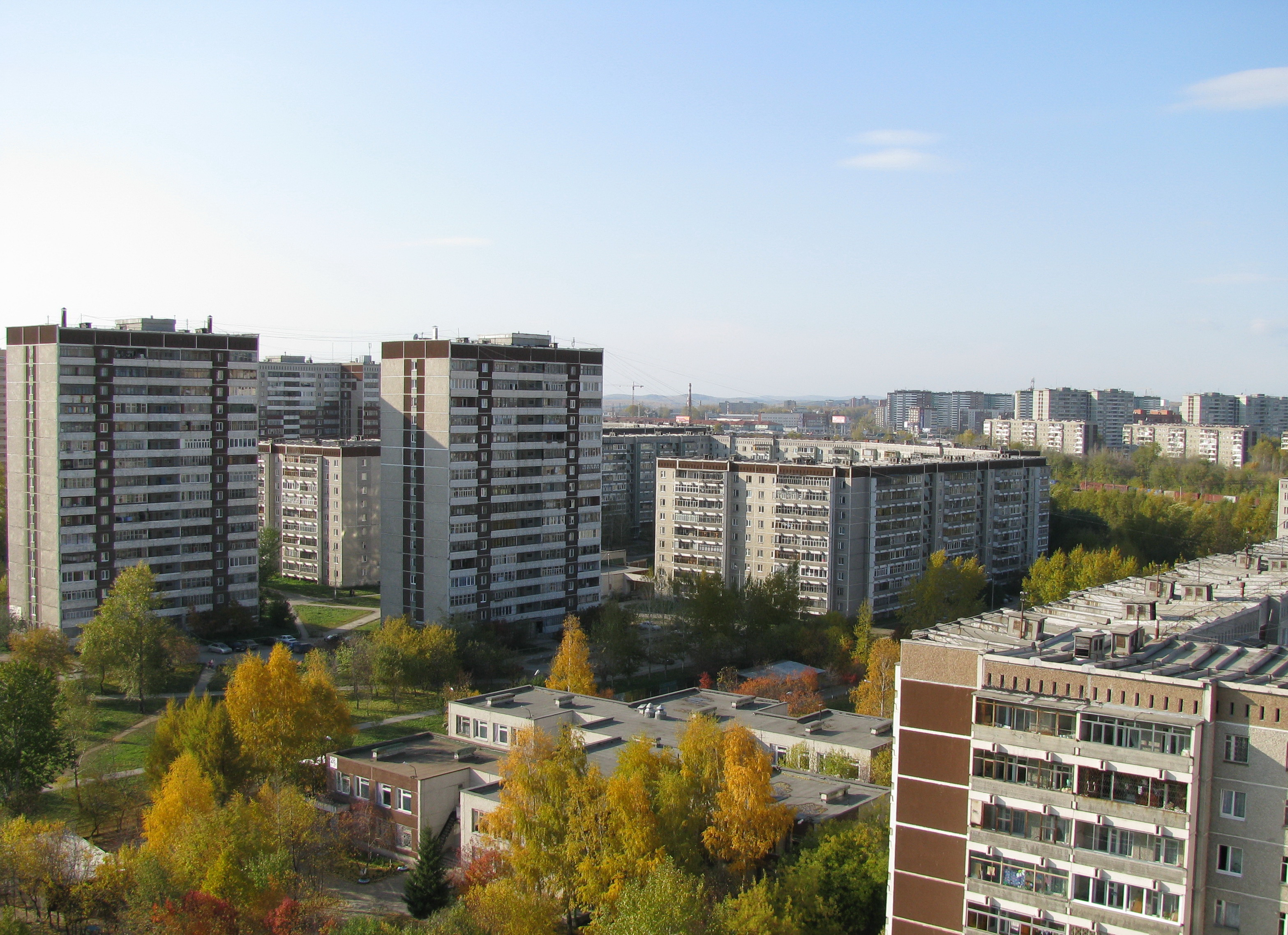
Autumn in Yekaterinburg

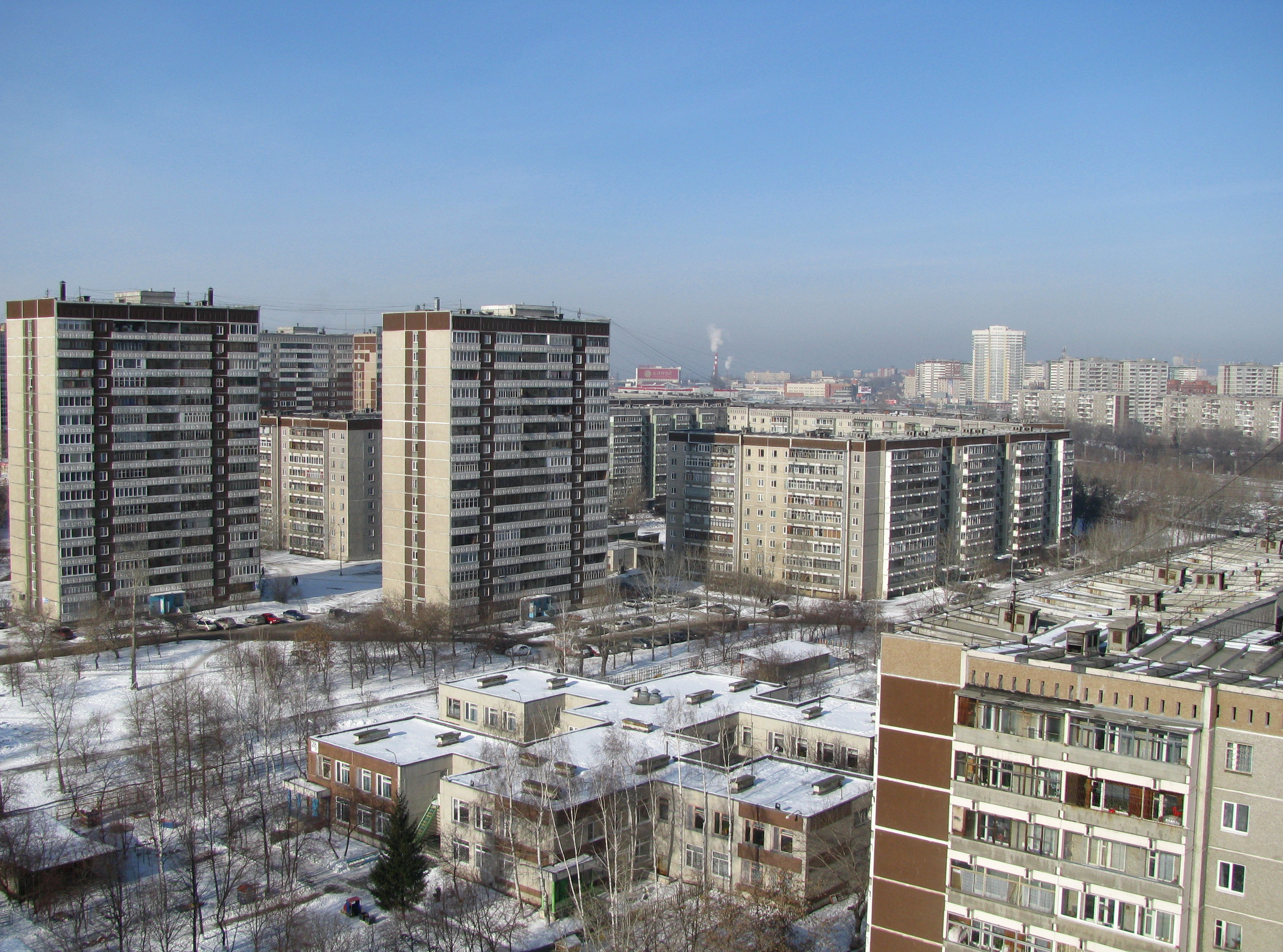
Winter in Yekaterinburg

The distribution of precipitation is determined by the circulation of air masses, relief, and air temperatures. The main part of the precipitation is brought by cyclones with a western air mass transfer, that is, from the European part of Russia, while their average annual amount is 601 mm. The maximum falls on a warm season, during which about 60–70% of the annual amount falls. For the winter period is characterized by snow cover with an average capacity of 40–50 cm. The aridity index is equal to 1.

- The average temperature in January is −12.6 °C (9.3 °F). The record minimum temperature is −44.6 °C (−48.3 °F) (6 January 1915);
- The average July temperature is 18.9 °C (66.0 °F). The record maximum temperature is 40.0 °C (104.0 °F) (11 July 2023);
- The average annual temperature is 2.1 °C (35.8 °F);
- The average annual wind speed is 2.9 m/s (10 km/h; 6.5 mph);
- The average annual humidity is 75%;
- The average annual precipitation is 534 mm (21.0 in);

Climate data for Yekaterinburg (1991–2020, extremes 1831–present)
Month	Jan	Feb	Mar	Apr	May	Jun	Jul	Aug	Sep	Oct	Nov	Dec	Year
Record high °C (°F)	5.6 (42.1)	9.4 (48.9)	20.7 (69.3)	28.8 (83.8)	34.7 (94.5)	36.5 (97.7)	40.0 (104.0)	37.2 (99.0)	31.9 (89.4)	24.7 (76.5)	13.5 (56.3)	5.9 (42.6)	40.0 (104.0)
Mean daily maximum °C (°F)	−9.3 (15.3)	−6.6 (20.1)	0.9 (33.6)	10.1 (50.2)	18.3 (64.9)	22.6 (72.7)	24.3 (75.7)	21.4 (70.5)	15.0 (59.0)	6.9 (44.4)	−2.6 (27.3)	−7.8 (18.0)	7.8 (46.0)
Daily mean °C (°F)	−12.6 (9.3)	−10.8 (12.6)	−3.6 (25.5)	4.7 (40.5)	12.2 (54.0)	16.9 (62.4)	18.9 (66.0)	16.2 (61.2)	10.4 (50.7)	3.6 (38.5)	−5.4 (22.3)	−10.7 (12.7)	3.3 (37.9)
Mean daily minimum °C (°F)	−15.5 (4.1)	−14.1 (6.6)	−7.3 (18.9)	0.3 (32.5)	6.9 (44.4)	12.0 (53.6)	14.4 (57.9)	12.2 (54.0)	6.8 (44.2)	1.0 (33.8)	−7.8 (18.0)	−13.3 (8.1)	−0.4 (31.3)
Record low °C (°F)	−44.6 (−48.3)	−42.4 (−44.3)	−39.2 (−38.6)	−21.8 (−7.2)	−13.5 (7.7)	−5.3 (22.5)	1.5 (34.7)	−2.2 (28.0)	−9.0 (15.8)	−22.0 (−7.6)	−39.2 (−38.6)	−44.0 (−47.2)	−44.6 (−48.3)
Average precipitation mm (inches)	25 (1.0)	19 (0.7)	25 (1.0)	31 (1.2)	47 (1.9)	73 (2.9)	93 (3.7)	75 (3.0)	45 (1.8)	41 (1.6)	33 (1.3)	28 (1.1)	534 (21.0)
Average extreme snow depth cm (inches)	33 (13)	42 (17)	38 (15)	5 (2.0)	0 (0)	0 (0)	0 (0)	0 (0)	0 (0)	1 (0.4)	8 (3.1)	21 (8.3)	42 (17)
Average rainy days	1	1	5	13	20	20	19	22	22	17	6	1	147
Average snowy days	26	23	18	10	4	0.4	0	0	2	13	23	25	144
Average relative humidity (%)	79	75	68	60	58	63	68	73	75	75	78	79	71
Mean monthly sunshine hours	47	94	164	206	256	272	269	217	143	78	51	37	1,834
Source 1: Pogoda.ru
Source 2: NOAA (sun 1961–1990)

== Demographics ==
=== Population ===
Historical population
Year	Pop.	±%
1897	37,399	—
1926	134,831	+260.5%
1939	425,533	+215.6%
1959	778,602	+83.0%
1970	1,025,045	+31.7%
1979	1,211,172	+18.2%
1989	1,364,621	+12.7%
2002	1,293,537	−5.2%
2010	1,349,772	+4.3%
2021	1,544,376	+14.4%

According to the results of the 2021 Census, the population of Yekaterinburg was 1,544,376; up from 1,349,772 recorded in the 2010 Census.

As of 2021, the ethnic composition of Yekaterinburg was:

Ethnicity	Population	Percentage
Russians	1,172,704	91.0%
Tatars	27,431	2.1%
Tajiks	13,102	1.0%
Kyrgyz	8,769	0.7%
Bashkirs	6,121	0.5%
Ukrainians	4,987	0.4%
Uzbeks	4,755	0.4%
Armenians	4,307	0.3%
Azerbaijanis	4,014	0.3%
Others	42,033	3.3%

=== Religion ===
Religion in Yekaterinburg (2024)
1. Orthodoxy (65.0%)
2. Islam (12.0%)
3. Atheists / Non-Religious (17.5%)
4. other christians (3.00%)
5. difficult to say (2.50%)

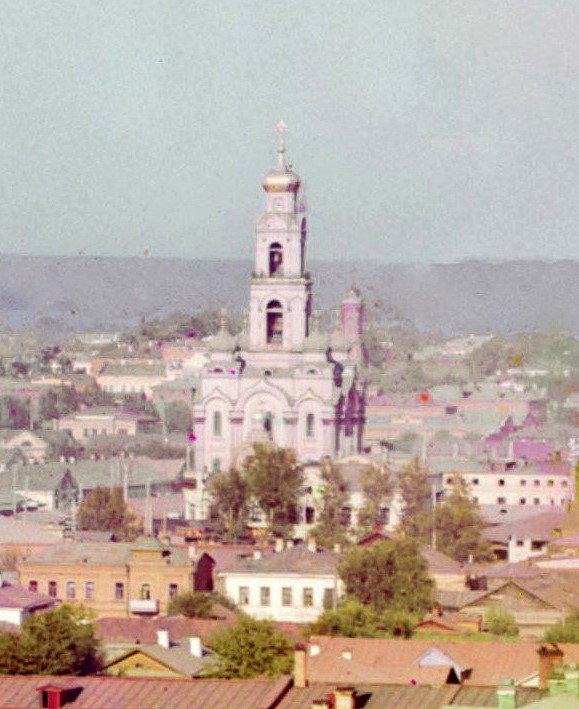
This photo by Sergey Prokudin-Gorsky from 1910 shows the tallest building in the Urals at the time, the Great Zlatoust bell tower

Christianity is the predominant religion in the city, of which most are adherents to the Russian Orthodox Church. The Yekaterinburg and Verkhotursky diocese is located in the Holy Trinity Cathedral in the city. Other religions practised in Yekaterinburg include Islam, Old Believers, Catholicism, Protestantism, and Judaism.

Yekaterinburg has a significant Muslim community, but it suffers from a lack of worship space: there are only two small mosques. Another mosque was built in the nearby city of Verkhnyaya Pyshma. On 24 November 2007, the first stone was laid in the construction of a large congregational mosque with four minarets, and space for 2,500 parishioners in the immediate vicinity of the cathedral and a synagogue, thus forming the "area of the three religions". The mosque was planned to be built for the SCO summit, but due to funding problems, construction did not move from zero and is now frozen.

Construction of a Methodist church started in 1992, and with the help of American donations, finished in 2001. A synagogue was opened in 2005, on the same place a 19th-century synagogue was demolished in 1962.

Most of the city's religious buildings were destroyed during the Soviet era, in addition to the synagogue, the three largest Orthodox churches in Yekaterinburg were demolished – the Epiphany Cathedral, the Ekaterininsky Cathedral, and the Great Zlatoust Church. Other Christian churches such as the Lutheran Church of Yekaterinburg and the Roman Catholic Church of St. Anne (a new Catholic St. Anne's Church was built in 2000) were demolished as well. Other churches were used as warehouses and industrial sites. The only religious building in Yekaterinburg in the Soviet era was the Cathedral of St. John the Baptist. Recently, some churches are being rebuilt. Since 2006, according to the surviving drawings, the Great Zlatoust Church was restored in 2012. On 17 April 2010, the city was visited by Patriarch Kirill.

== Government ==
Yekaterinburg is the administrative centre of Sverdlovsk Oblast. Within the framework of the administrative divisions, it is, together with twenty-nine rural localities, incorporated as the City of Yekaterinburg, an administrative unit with the status equal to that of the districts. As a municipal division, the City of Yekaterinburg is incorporated as Yekaterinburg Urban Okrug.

=== Administrative districts ===
Administrative districts of Yekaterinburg
Label	OKATO	Name	Area (2019)	Population (2019)	Founded	Head	Website	Dialing code(s)	Subdivisions
1	65 401 362	Akademicheskiy		81,000	2020	Smirnyagin Nikolai Sergeevich		+7 3432, +7 3433	3
2	65 401 364	Verkh-Isetsky	240 square kilometres (93 mi^{2})	221,207	1919	Morozov Andrey Mikhailovich	.cm	+7 3432, +7 3433	5
3	65 401 368	Zheleznodorozhnyy	126.3 square kilometres (48.8 mi^{2})	221,207	1938	Pershin Vitaly Pavlovich	.cm	+7 343	8
4	65 401 373	Kirovsky	72 square kilometres (28 mi^{2})	228,864	1943	Bolikov Vladimir Yurievich	.cm	+7 343	7
5	65 401 377	Leninsky	25 square kilometres (9.7 mi^{2})	156,723	1934	Beruashvili Elena Zauryevna	.cm	+7 343	3
6	65 401 380	Oktyabrsky	157 square kilometres (61 mi^{2})	148,981	1934	Kostenko Igor Vitalievich	.cm	+7 3432	11
7	65 401 385	Ordzhonikidzevsky	102 square kilometres (39 mi^{2})	286,482	1934	Kravchenko Roman Gennadievich	.cm	+7 3433	6
8	65 401 390	Chkalovsky	402 square kilometres (155 mi^{2})	275,571	1943	Shipitsyn Evgeny Viktorovich	.cm	+7 3432	10

Each district is not a municipal formation, and the historical centre of the city is divided into five inner-city districts (except Chkalovsky and Ordzhonikidzevsky).

A district named Akademicheskiy was formed from the parts of Leninsky and Verkh-Isetsky districts on 3 January 2020. On 1 October 2021, more settlements were transferred from Verkh-Isetsky to Akademicheskiy district.

=== Administration ===
==== Urban ====
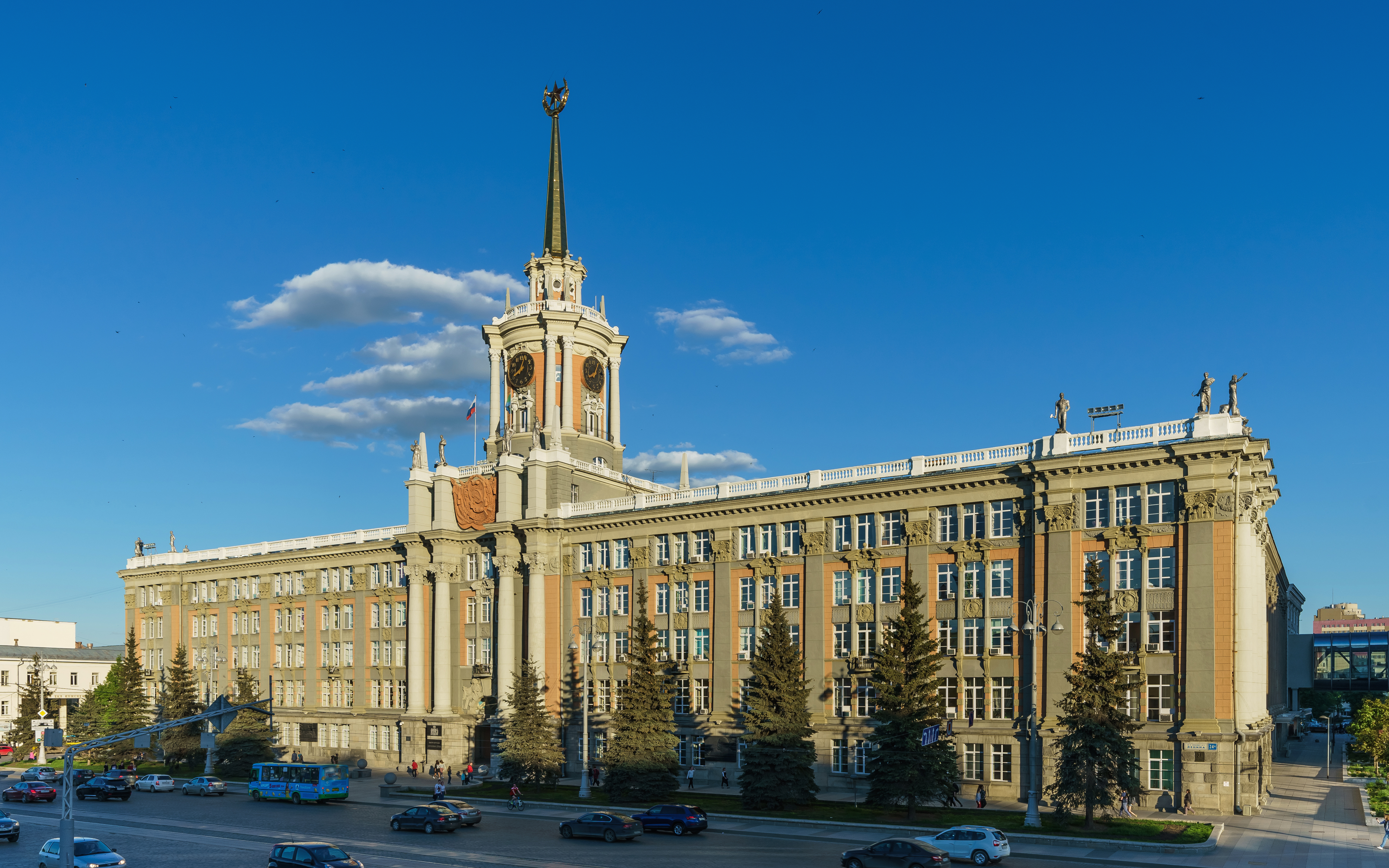
Building of the Administration of Yekaterinburg located on 1905 Square

The Charter of Yekaterinburg establishes a four-link system for the organisation of local authorities, which includes: the head of Yekaterinburg, who serves as the chairman of the Yekaterinburg City Duma, the Yekaterinburg City Duma, the Administration of the City of Yekaterinburg, and the Chamber of Accounts.

According to the charter of Yekaterinburg, the highest official of the municipal formation is the mayor of Yekaterinburg. The mayor is elected by universal suffrage, but since 3 April 2018, the procedure for direct elections of the mayor of the City of Yekaterinburg was abolished. The mayor of the city is endowed with representative powers and powers to organize activities and guide the activities of the City Duma. In addition, the mayor of the city exercises other powers such as concluding a contract with the head of the city administration and ensuring compliance with the Russian Constitution, Russian legislation, the city charter, and other normative acts.

In the event of a temporary absence of the mayor of Yekaterinburg, his authority under his written order is exercised by the deputy mayor of Yekaterinburg.

The representative body of the municipal formation is the Yekaterinburg City Duma, which represents the city's entire population. The membership of the Duma is 36 deputies (18 deputies were elected in single-mandate constituencies and 18 in a single electoral district). Residents of the city elect deputies on the basis of universal suffrage for a period of 5 years.

The executive and administrative body of the municipal formation is the Administration of the City of Yekaterinburg, led by the head of the Administration, currently held by Aleksandr Yacob. The administration is endowed with its own powers to resolve issues of local importance, but it is under the control and accountable to the Yekaterinburg City Duma. The building of the Administration of Yekaterinburg is located on 1905 Square.

The Chamber of Accounts is a permanently operating body of external municipal financial control. The Chamber is formed by the apparatus of the City Duma and is accountable to it. The Chamber consists of the chairman, deputy chairman, auditors and staff. The structure and number of staff of the chamber, including the number of auditors, is determined by the decision of the City Duma. The term of office of the Chamber staff is 5 years. The Chamber of Accounts is a legal entity.

==== Oblast ====
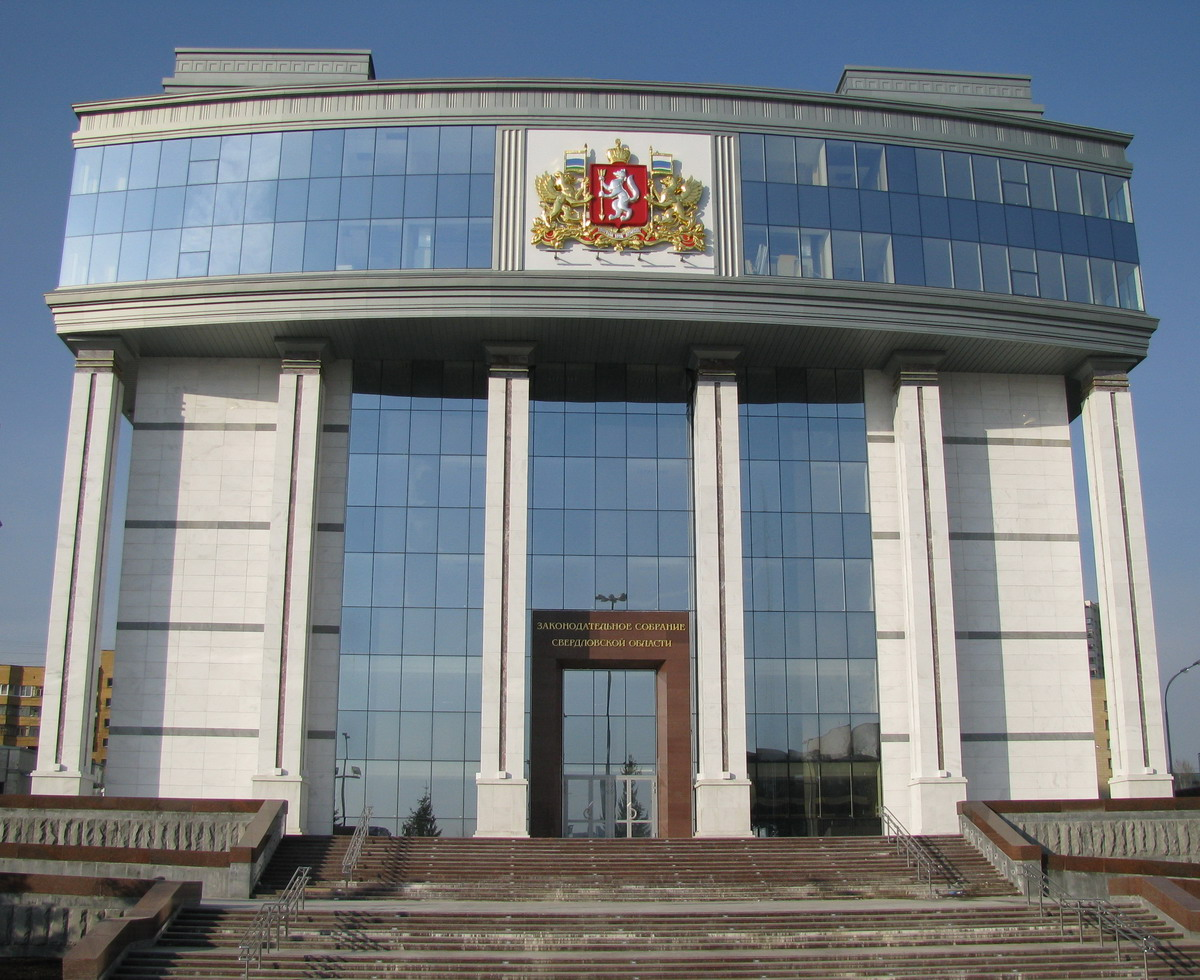
The building of Sverdlovsk Oblast's Legislative Assembly

In accordance with the regional charter, Yekaterinburg is the administrative centre of the Sverdlovsk Oblast. The executive power is exercised by the governor of Sverdlovsk Oblast, the legislative power by the legislative assembly of Sverdlovsk Oblast, and the judicial power by the Sverdlovsk Regional Court, located in the building of the Palace of Justice. The building serving the regional government is the White House and the building serving the legislative assembly is located next to it on October Square. The ministries of the Sverdlovsk Region are located in the building of the regional government, as well as in other separate buildings of the city.

==== Federal ====
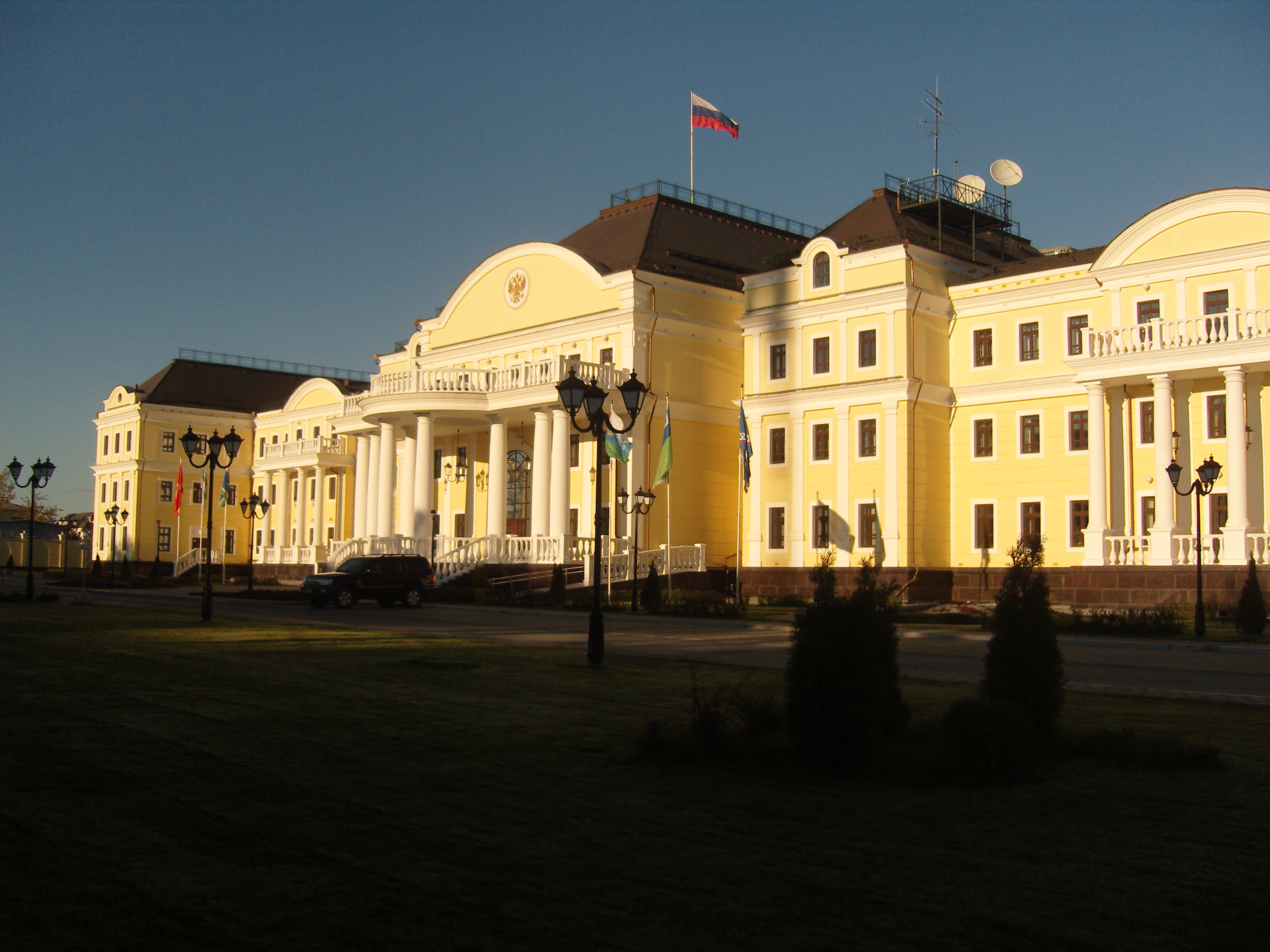
Residence of the presidential envoy of the Ural Federal District

Yekaterinburg serves as the centre of the Ural Federal District. As a result, it serves as the residence of the presidential envoy, the highest official of the district and part of the administration of the president of Russia. The residence is located the building of the regional government on October Square near the Iset River embankment.

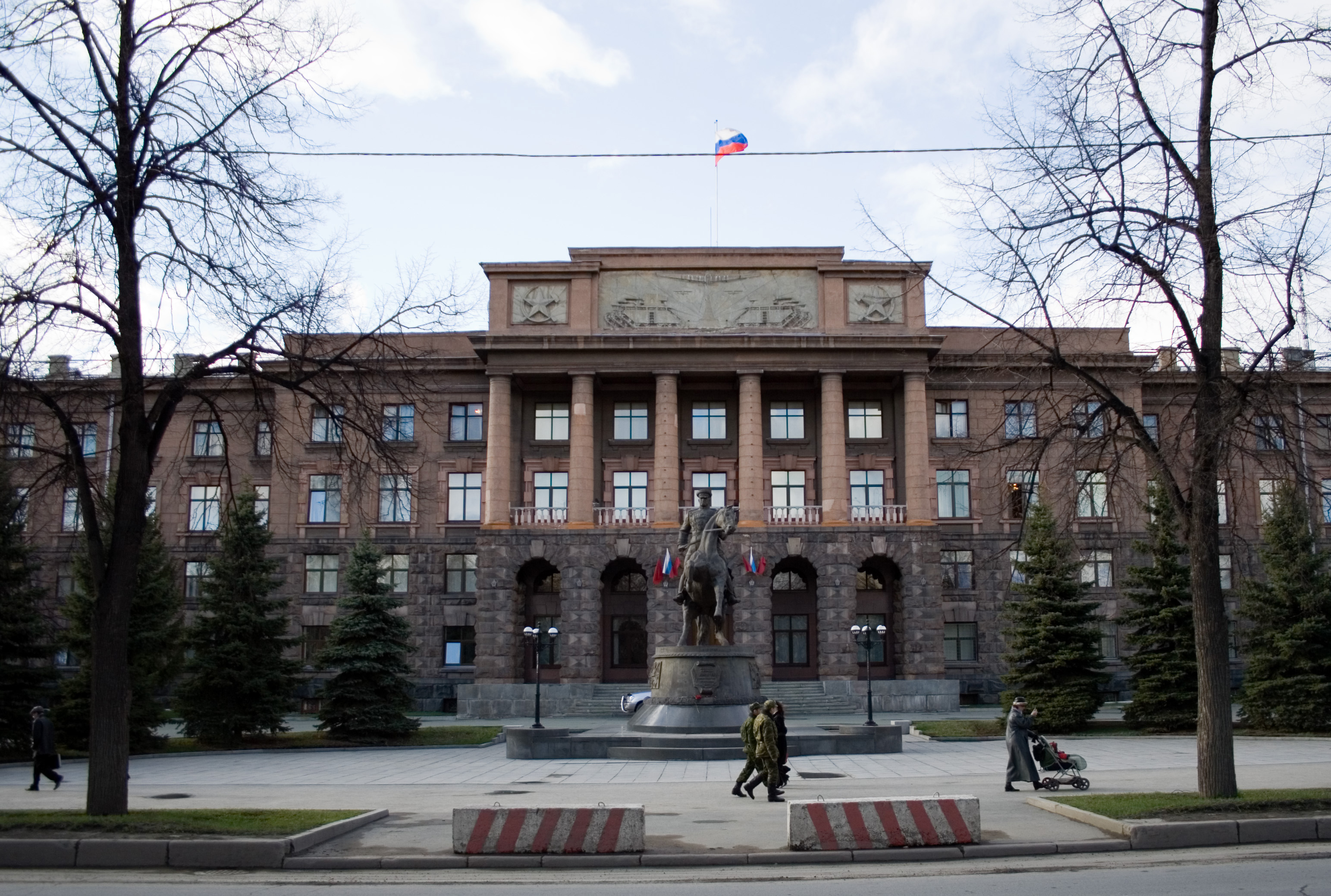
The Central Military District headquarters building

In addition, Yekaterinburg serves as the centre of the Central Military District and more than 30 territorial branches of the federal executive bodies, whose jurisdiction extends not only to Sverdlovsk Oblast, but also to other regions in the Ural Mountains, Siberia, and the Volga Region.

=== Politics ===
According to the results of the September 2013 elections, the mayor of the city was Yevgeny Roizman, nominated by the Civil Platform party. Out of the 36 seats in the City Duma, 21 belong to United Russia, 7 to A Just Russia, 3 to the Civil Platform, 2 to the Communist Party and 1 seat to the LDPR. The turnout in the mayoral elections was 33.57%.

Russian federal legislative election, 2016
United Russia	Dmitry Medvedev	78,289	38.4%	
SRZP	Sergey Mironov	31,288	15.4%	
LDPR	Leonid Slutsky (politician)	25,869	12.7%	
CPRF	Gennady Zyuganov	22,293	10.9%	
Yabloko	Nikolay Rybakov	11,340	5.6%	
Party	Candidate	Votes	%	±%

It was the last popular vote in Yekaterinburg. Since 2018, there have been no elections, but a vote in the Municipal Duma. On 25 September 2018 the majority of the representatives in the Duma voted in favour of the vice-governor of Sverdlovsk oblast, Alexander Vysokinskiy.

== Economy ==
=== Overview ===
Yekaterinburg is one of the largest economic centres in Russia. It is included in the City-600 list (it unites the 600 largest cities in the world that produce 60% of global GDP), compiled by the McKinsey Global Institute, a research organisation. In 2010, the consulting company estimated the gross product of Yekaterinburg to be about $19 billion (according to the calculations of the company, it should grow to $40 billion by 2025).

By volume of the economy, Yekaterinburg ranks third in the country, after Moscow and St. Petersburg. According to a research of the Institute for Urban Economics, in the ranking of the largest cities and regional capital cities according to economic standards for 2015, Yekaterinburg ranked third. The city's gross urban product (GVP) was 898 billion rubles. Per capita GDP was 621.0 thousand rubles (18th place). In 2015, the gross urban product of the Yekaterinburg metropolitan area amounted to 50.7 billion international dollars (the fourth place in the country) or 25.4 thousand international dollars in terms of per inhabitant of the metropolitan area.

In the Soviet era, Yekaterinburg (as Sverdlovsk) was a purely industrial city, with a share of industry in the economy of 90% (of which 90% were in defense production). With Chelyabinsk and Perm, the three cities formed what to be the Urals industrial hub.

The former head of Yekaterinburg, Arkady Chernetsky, has set the goal of diversifying the city's economy, which has resulted in the development of sectors such as warehousing, transportation, logistics, telecommunications, financial sector, wholesale and retail trade, etc. in Yekaterinburg. Economist-geographer Natalia Zubarevich points out that at the present stage, Yekaterinburg has practically lost its industrial specialisation.

=== Living costs and the labor market ===
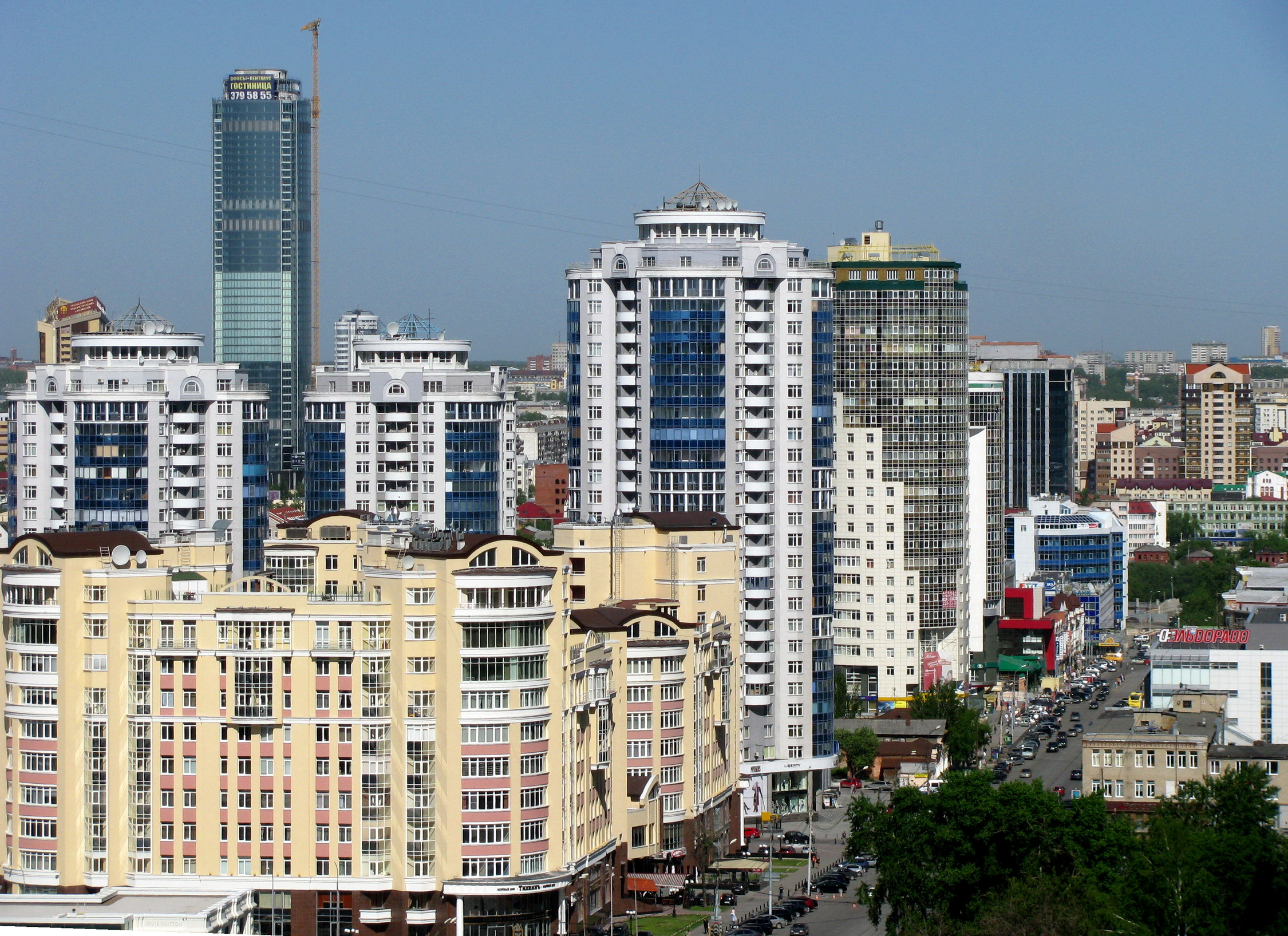
Aquamarine apartment complex with the topped out 188-meter Vysotsky skyscraper in the background

The standard of living in Yekaterinburg exceeds the average standard across Russia. According to the Department of Sociology of the Financial University under the Government of the Russian Federation, it is among the top ten cities with the highest standard of living. Compared to other Russian cities with a population of around or over one million, in 2015, Yekaterinburg held a leading position in terms of average monthly wages and retail turnover, in terms of the total volume of investments in fourth place of fixed assets, and second place in housing placement.

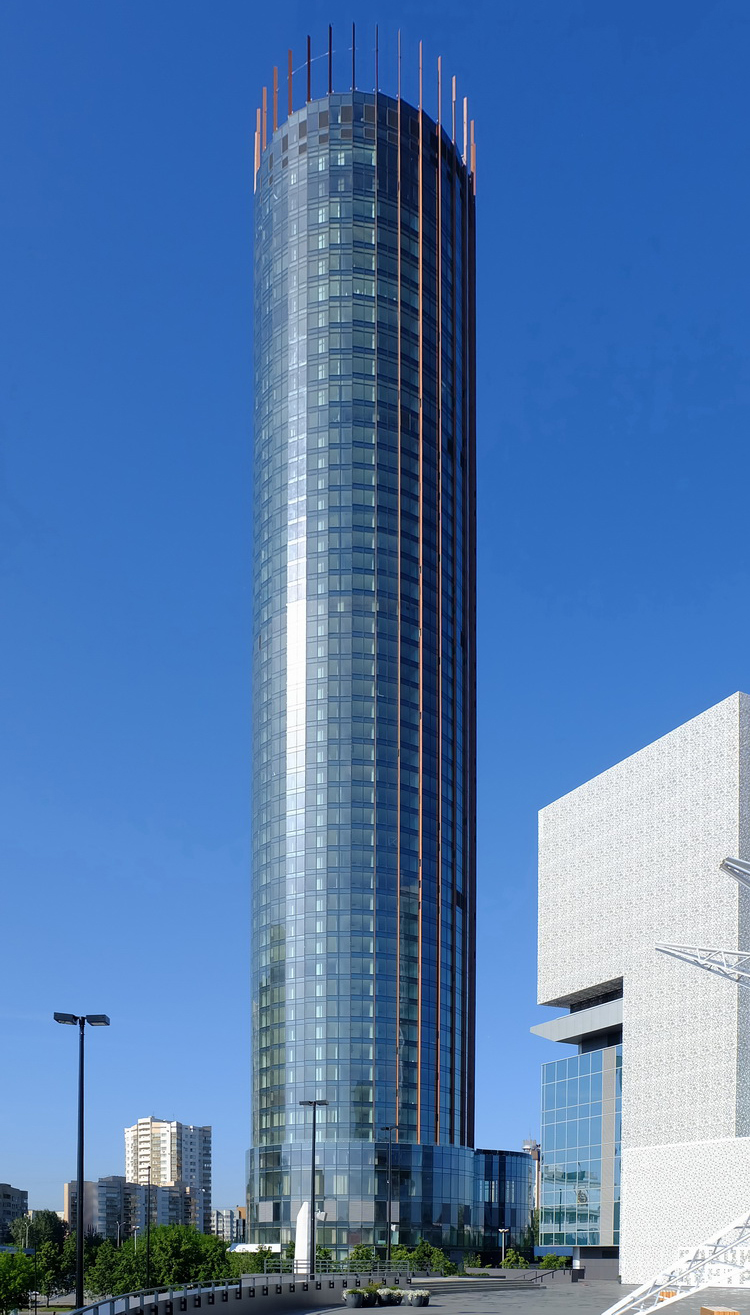
Iset Tower is a 52-story residential skyscraper and is the tallest building in Yekaterinburg. It is located within the vicinity of Yekaterinburg-City

The average monthly wage in Yekaterinburg following the results of 2019 was 54,976 rubles. This is the first place among the millionth municipalities of the Russian Federation. There are on average 440,300 people employed by large and middle-sized organisations and companies. The unemployment rate at the end of 2015 was 0.83% of the total economically active population. Locals labelled the main problems of the city such the current state of the healthcare system, housing system, and transportation system.

The budget of Yekaterinburg in 2015 was executed on income in the amount of 32,063.6 million rubles, for expenses in the amount of 32,745.8 million rubles. Among the budget expenditures: 17 billion rubles were spent on education, over 1 billion rubles on culture, and about 900 million rubles on health. The main part of the revenue of the city treasury was its own tax and non-tax revenues (more than 18 billion rubles). The revenues from the regional and federal budgets were at the lowest level in 10 years. Specialists noted a decrease in tax revenues and an increase in tax debt (exceeded 2 billion rubles).

The main budget expenditures are the development of the economy (which accounts for 19% of expenditures) and the social security of the townspeople (11% of expenditures go). Cities such as Perm, Kazan and Ufa, spend for these purposes in a smaller percentage of costs (from 2 to 6%). Also, a fairly strict budgetary discipline is noted—the budget deficit is kept at the level of 2% of its volume.

=== Finance and business ===
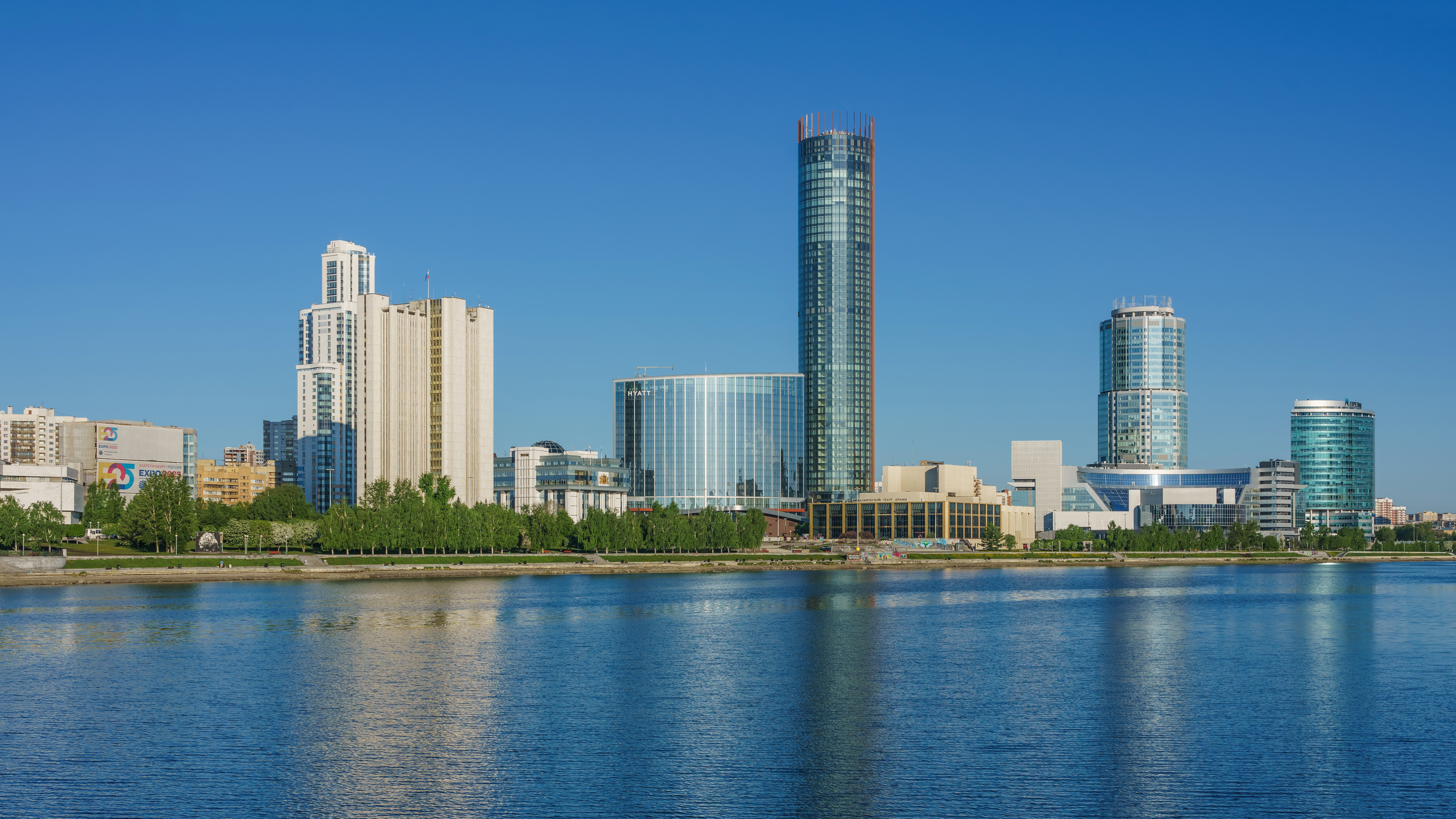
Yekaterinburg-City along the Iset River

Yekaterinburg is one of the largest financial and business centres in Russia, with offices of multinational corporations, representative offices of foreign companies, and a large number of federal and regional financial and credit organisations. The financial market of Yekaterinburg is characterised by stability and independence, based both on the broad presence of large foreign and Moscow credit organisations and on the availability of large and stable local financial holdings.

The financial sector of Yekaterinburg has more than 100 banks, including 11 foreign banks. The list of the largest Russian banks for assets for 2016 included 10 banks registered in Yekaterinburg, including but not all: Ural Bank for Reconstruction and Development, SKB-Bank, Uraltransbank, and UM Bank.

IT "SKB Kontur" from Yekaterinburg – the largest software manufacturer in Russia – first place according to the RAEX rating.

Also in Yekaterinburg is the Ural headquarters of the Central Bank of Russia. Since 7 August 2017, by order of the Bank of Russia, the branches of the Siberian, Far Eastern and part of the Prevolzhsky Federal Districts have been transferred to the control of the Ural Megaregal Directorate. Thus, this is one of the three main departments of the Mega-regulator in the territory of Russia.

A major role in the formation of Yekaterinburg as a business centre has its infrastructural potential, which is growing at a high rate: transport accessibility for Russian and foreign economic entities, the availability of hotels, advanced communication services, business related services (consulting, exhibition activities, etc.). Yekaterinburg has its own central business district, Yekaterinburg City.

=== Industry ===
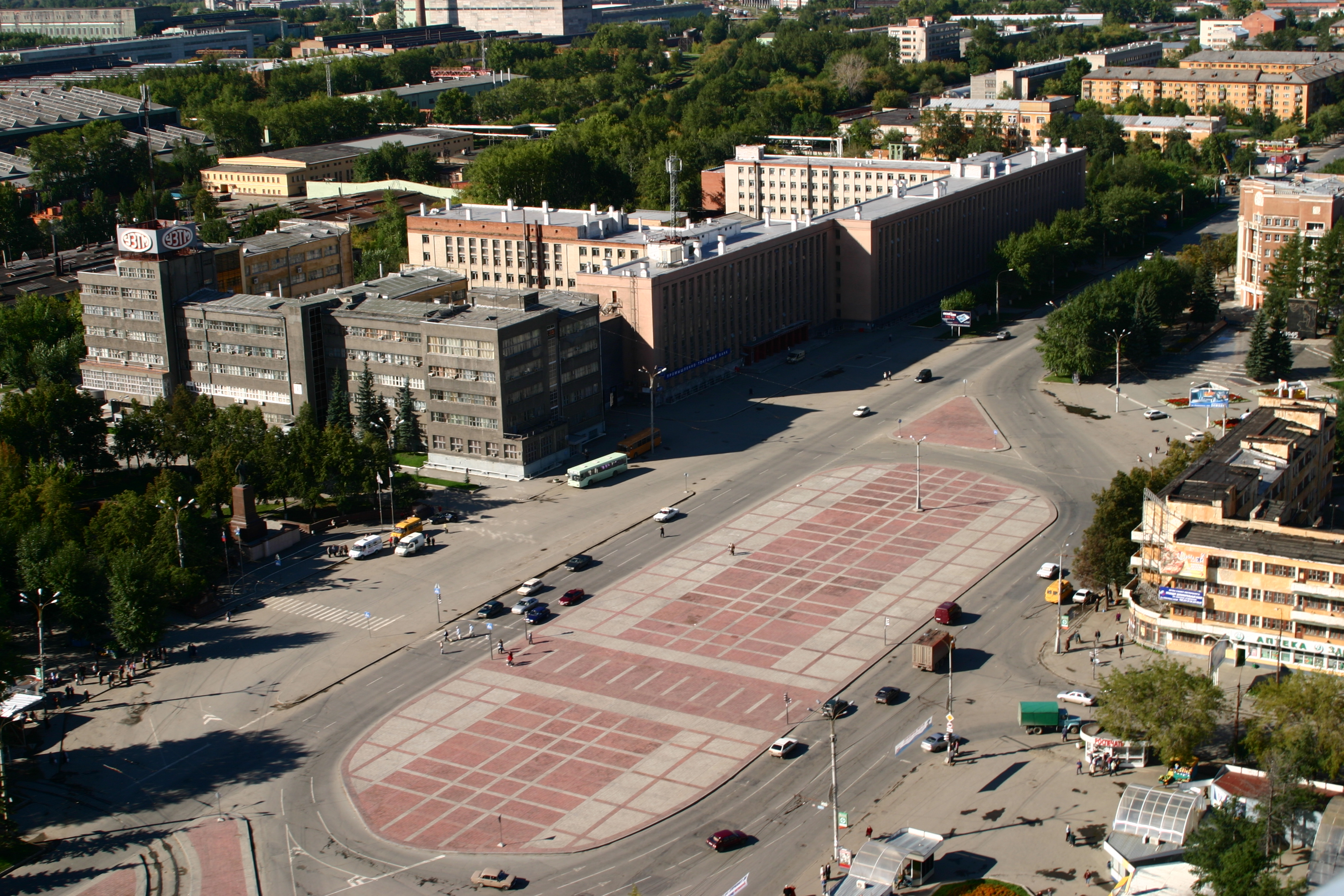
1st Pyatiletka Square, where Uralmash is headquartered

Yekaterinburg has been a major industrial centre since its foundation. In the 18th century, the main branches were smelting and processing of metal. Since the beginning of the 19th century, machine building appeared, and in the second half of the 19th century, light and food (especially milling) industry was widely spread. A new stage in the development of production occurred during the period of industrialisation – at this time in the city, factories were built, which determined the industry specialisation of heavy engineering. During World War II, Yekaterinburg (as Sverdlovsk) hosted about sixty enterprises evacuated from Central Russia and Ukraine. As a result, there was a sharp increase in the production capacity of existing plants and the emergence of new branches of the Urals industry.

At present, more than 220 large and medium-sized enterprises are registered in Yekaterinburg, 197 of them in manufacturing industries. In 2015, they shipped 323,288 million rubles worth of own-produced goods. Production by industry was divided accordingly: metallurgical production and metalworking 20.9%, food production 13.3%, production of electrical equipment, electronic and optical equipment 9.2%, production of vehicles 8.4%, production of machinery and equipment 6.4%, chemical production 5.5%, production of other nonmetallic mineral products 3.7%, production of rubber and plastic products 2.8%, pulp and paper production, publishing and printing 0.5%, and other 29.3%.

Several headquarters of large Russian industrial companies are located in the city: IDGC of Urals, Enel Russia, Steel-Industrial Company, Russian Copper Company, Kalina, NLMK-Sort, VIZ-Stal, Sinara Group, Uralelectrotyazhmash, Automation Association named after academician NA Semikhatov, Ural Heavy Machinery Plant (Uralmash), Fat Plant, Fores, confectionery association Sladko, Machine Building Plant named after M.I. Kalinin, Ural Turbine Plant, Uralkhimmash and others.

=== Retail and services ===
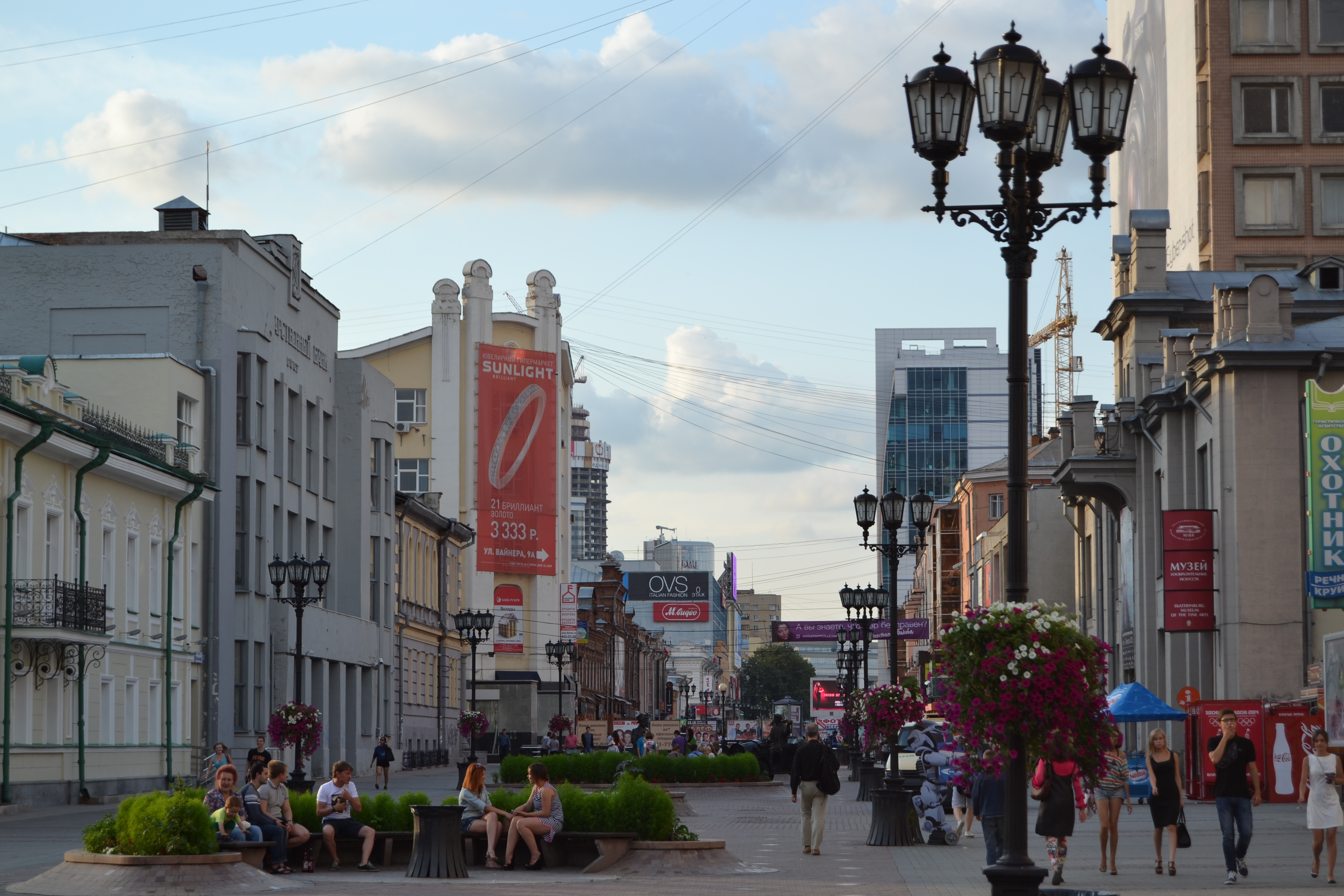
Vaynera Street, a pedestrian street with lots of retail shops

Yekaterinburg ranks first in retail trade of the Russian Federation per capita, ahead of Moscow. The consumer market contributes significantly to Yekaterinburg's economy. Revenue of retail stores in 2015 amounted to 725.9 billion rubles, and the number of retailers totaled 4,290. As of 1 January 2016, 36 shopping centers operate in the city, taking up a total area of which was 1,502,700 m^{2} (16,175,000 sq ft). The availability of shopping centres per 1,000 inhabitants increased to 597.2 m^{2} (6,428 sq ft).

Retail areas amounted to 2,019,000 m^{2} (21,730,000 sq ft), with the availability of retail space reached 1,366.3 m^{2} (14,707 sq ft) per 1,000 inhabitants. According to these statistics, Yekaterinburg holds leading positions among other major cities of Russia. In the consumer market of Yekaterinburg, 1041 network operators are represented. The number of wholesale enterprises totalled 1,435. Among the Federal construction stores represented in the city, you can select: Leroy Merlin, Castorama, Domostroy, Maxidom, OBI, Sdvor. Yekaterinburg has an agricultural market named Shartashsky.

The revenue of catering in 2015 totalled 38.6 billion rubles. The network of catering enterprises in Yekaterinburg is presented as follows: 153 restaurants, 210 bars, 445 cafes, 100 coffee houses, 582 dining rooms, 189 eateries, 173 fast-food establishments, 10 tea shops, 319 other types of institutions (buffets, cafeterias, catering companies). 82.6% of catering enterprises provide additional services to consumers.

The revenue of the services industry in 2015 totalled 74.9 billion rubles. The fastest pace in the city is developing hairdressing services, sewing and knitting atelier services, pawnshop services, fitness centre services. The network of public service enterprises in Yekaterinburg includes 5,185 facilities. In 2015, the provision of service areas for service enterprises totaled 382.1 m^{2} (4,113 sq ft) per 1,000 citizens. The highest concentration of household services is observed in the Verkh-Isetsky, Oktyabrsky and Leninsky districts.

Greenwich Shopping Center, as of 2021, is the largest shopping center in Europe.

The largest store in the world by area is Sima-Land.

=== Tourism ===
Yekaterinburg is a major centre for the Russian tourist industry. In 2015, the city was one of the top five most visited Russian cities (others being Moscow, St. Petersburg, Novosibirsk, and Vladivostok) according to the Global Destinations Cities Index, which represents the payment system Mastercard. In recent years, a lot of work has been done to create a positive image of Yekaterinburg as a centre for international tourism, including holding of summits for the Shanghai Cooperation Organisation (SCO) in 2008 and 2009 and the international exhibition Innoprom in 2009 and 2010. In 2014, Yekaterinburg ranked third among Russian cities in popularity among foreign tourists after Moscow and St. Petersburg.

In 2015, the total flow of inbound tourism grew by 10% compared to the previous year and amounted to 2.1 million people. In recent years, there has been a tendency to reduce the role of business tourism in the overall flow: if in 2013 about 80% of trips were business, in 2015 their number was already 67%. Most tourists go to "bow to the memory of the last [czar] and his family." In addition, new tourist ideas are developing such as the Bazhov theme, the geological and mineralogical theme, industrial tourism, and the event calendar.

== Transportation ==
Yekaterinburg is the third largest transport hub of Russia, behind Moscow and St. Petersburg. The city has 6 federal highways, 7 main railway lines, and an international airport. The location of Yekaterinburg in the central part of the region allows for 7 to 10 hours to get from it to any large city of the Urals. The formation of Yekaterinburg as an important transportation hub is largely due to the city's favourable geographical location on a low stretch of the Ural Mountains, through which it was convenient to lay the main roads connecting the European and Eastern parts of Russia.

=== Roads ===
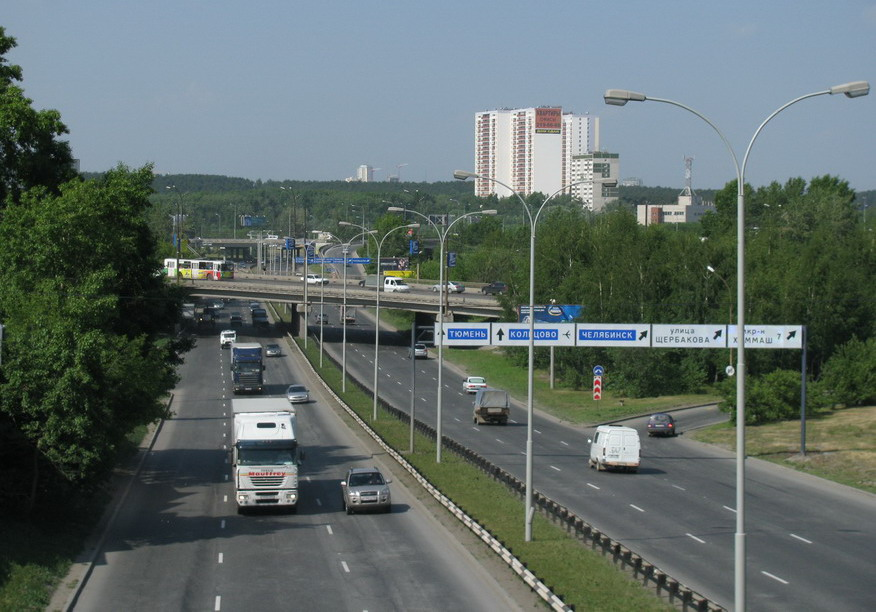
E22 bypass in the Chkalovsky District

Yekaterinburg is one of the ten Russian megacities with the largest car fleet (0.437 megacars were registered in the city in 2014), which has been intensively increasing in recent years (by 6–14% annually). The level of car ownership in 2015 has reached 410 cars per 1,000 people. Its pace in the past few years has seriously exceeded the pace of development and the capacity of the road infrastructure. For the first time, transport problems started to appear in Yekaterinburg in the 1980s and though it did not seem threatening at first, the situation gets worse every year. Studies have shown that as early as 2005, the capacity limit for the road network was reached, which has now led to permanent congestion. To increase the capacity of the street-road network, stage-by-stage reconstruction of streets is being carried out, as well as multi-level interchanges being built. In order to reduce the transit traffic, the Sverdlovsk Oblast administration announced two road projects in 2014: the Yekaterinburg Ring Road (EKAD) and an overpass road on Sovetskaya Street. The Yekaterinburg Ring Road would surround the largest municipalities of Yekaterinburg. Its purpose would be to help the city's economy and reduce traffic on the Middle Ring Road of the city, making it easier for civilians to commute around the city than going through the city's traffic congestion. Eventually, the Ring Road would connect to other federal roads in order for easier access between other Russian cities. Construction of the road started in the same year. The projects were assigned to the Ministry of Transport and Communications since the projects were crucial to the city's economy. Officials hope the road projects will build environments more conducive to improving local quality of life and outside investments. Completing these major inter-regional roads will increase productive traffic by 50% to 100%, improving the local economy with its ease of access to industries.

Since 2014, the project for the introduction of paid parking in the central part of Yekaterinburg is being implemented. The project is implemented in parallel with the increase in the number of intercepting parking lots and the construction of parking lots. At the end of 2015, in the central part of the city there were 2,307 paid parking places.

The total length of the road network in Yekaterinburg is 1,311.5 km (814.9 mi), of which 929.8 km (577.8 mi) is cobbled carriageways, 880 km (550 mi) is with upgraded coverage, 632 km (393 mi) is backbone networks, of which 155 km (96 mi) are on the citywide backbone network movement. 20 interchanges have been constructed at different levels within the city limits, including 11 on the EKAD and 9 on the middle ring. 74 transport facilities (27 bridges across the Iset River, Patrushikha, Mostovka, Istok Rivers, 13 dams on the Iset, Patrushikha, Istok, Olkhovka, Warm, Shilovka Rivers, 23 road overpasses, and 18 out-of-the-way pedestrian crossings) were built as well.

Yekaterinburg is served by the following highways:

- M5
- E22
- R351
- R352
- R354
- R355

=== Public transit ===
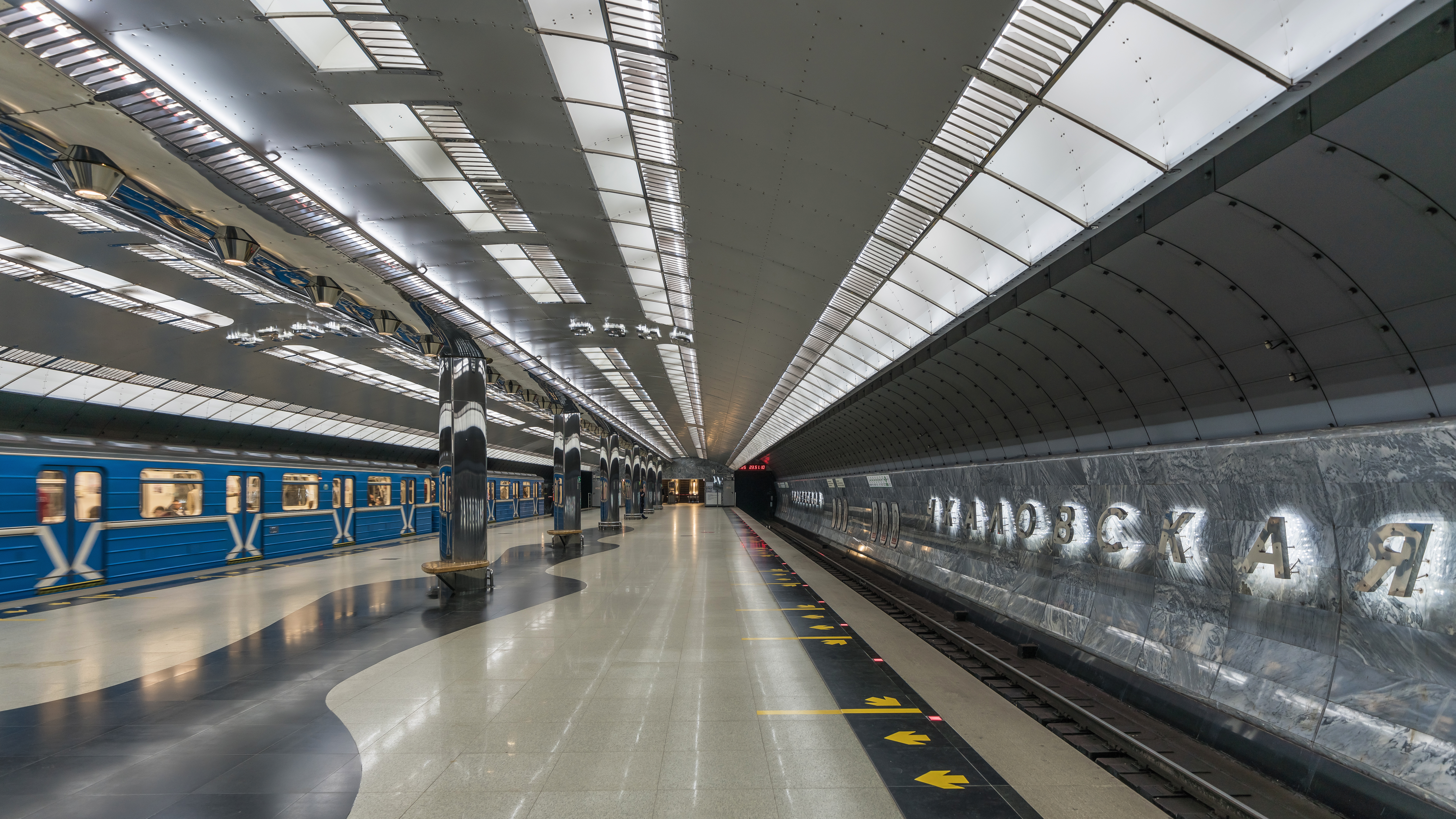
Chkalovskaya station of the Yekaterinburg Metro.

Yekaterinburg uses almost all types of public transport. The largest transportation services—the Municipal Association of Bus Enterprises, the Tram-Trolleybus Office, and the Yekaterinburg Metro —transported 207.4 million people in 2015. The total volume of passenger transportation by all land transport modes decreases annually. If the annual passenger traffic of municipal transport was 647.1 million people in 2002, and according to this index the city occupied the third place in the country with a wide margin, then in 2008 this figure would be 412 million people (the fourth place in Russia).

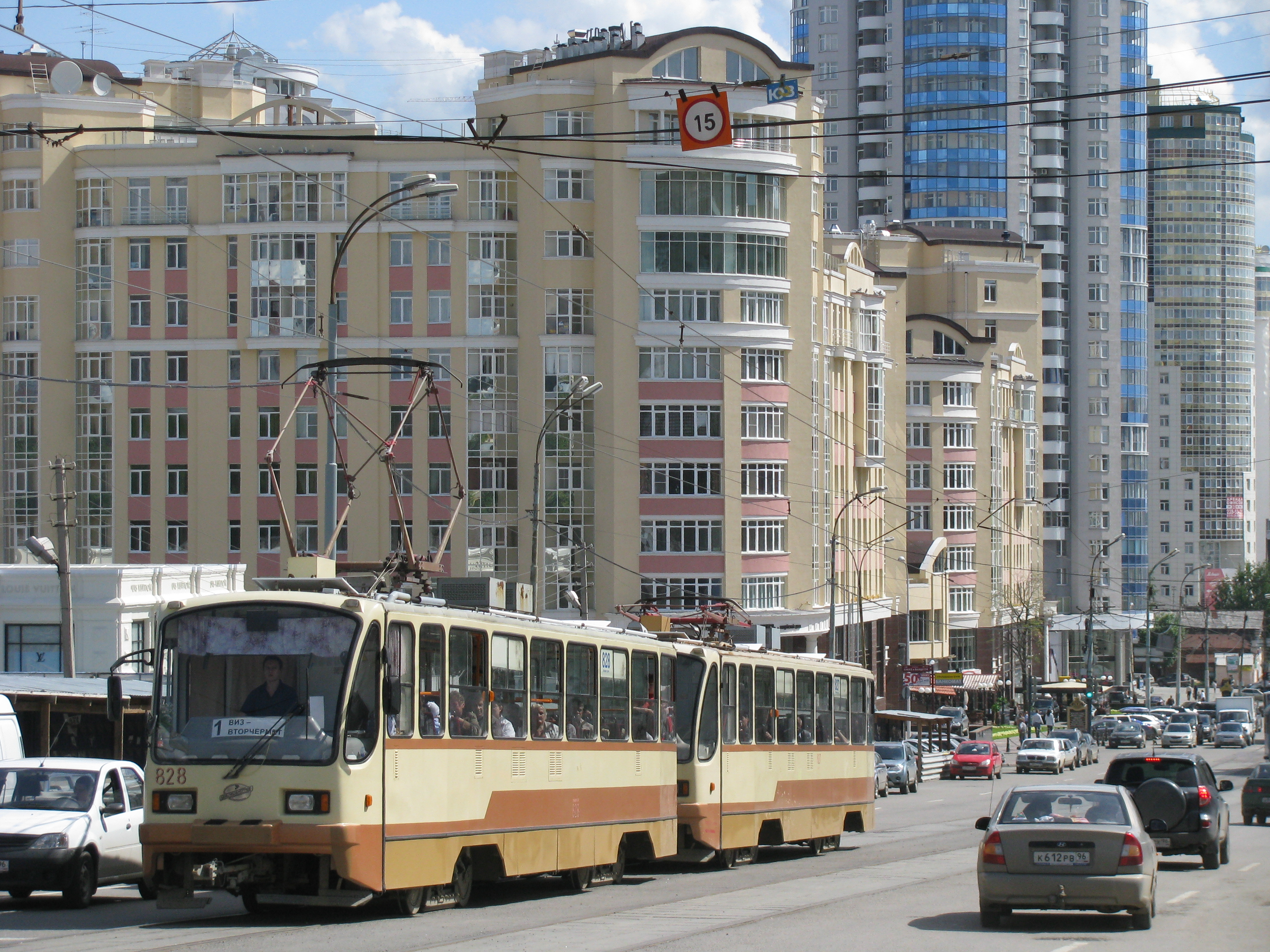
Yekaterinburg tram

Since 1991, the city operates the sixth metro in Russia and the thirteenth in the CIS. At the moment there is one line with 9 stations. In 2015 49.9 million passengers were transported; according to this metric the Yekaterinburg Metro is the fourth in Russia, behind the Moscow Metro, Saint Petersburg Metro, and Novosibirsk Metro. Although the metro is the second most popular type of public transport, in recent years significant problems have appeared in its work: loss-making, obsolete rolling stock, and a shortage of funds for modernisation. The tram network was established in 1929 and currently plays a leading role in the urban transport system. The volume of passengers carried for 2013 is 127.8 million, but this declines every year (245 million people in 2013). In 2016 there were 30 routes operating 459 cars. The total length of the tracks is 185.5 km. As of 2016, the construction of a tram line "Yekaterinburg-Verkhnyaya Pyshma" was planned.

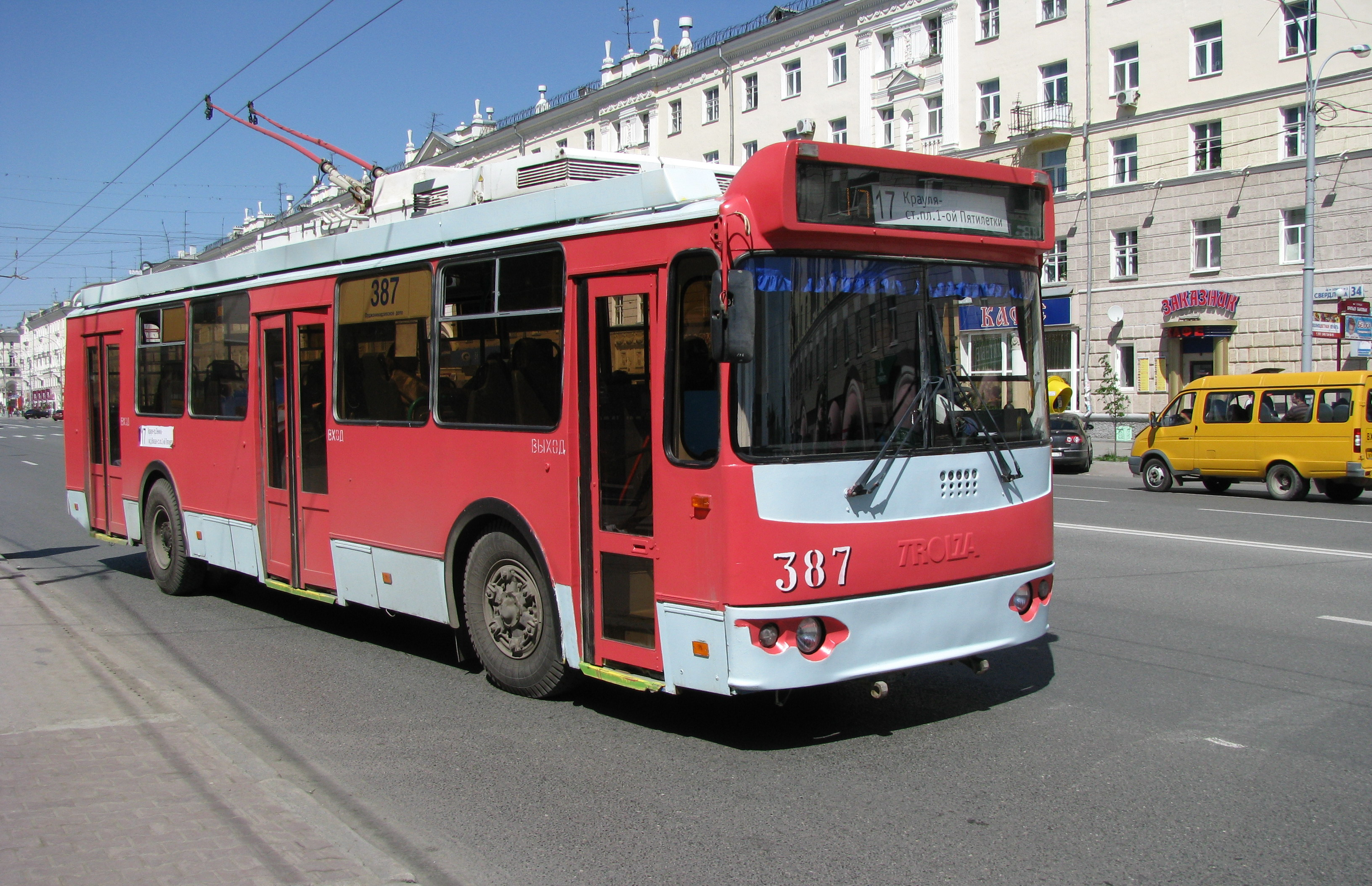
Yekaterinburg trolleybus

There are 93 bus routes operating in Yekaterinburg, including 30 municipal ones (EMUP "MOAP"). In 2007, 114.5 million passengers were transported by municipal intercity buses (124.6 million in 2006). The decrease in volume is due to the increasing role of the fixed-route taxis in the urban transport system of Yekaterinburg, as well as the high cost of travel. However, the city bus transport network provides significant employment for the people of Yekaterinburg, including the formidable babushkas who collect passenger fares. In the park of EMPU, there are 537 buses. In 2013, there are 19 routes, which employ 250 trolleybuses. The total length of trolleybus lines is 168.4 km. The number of passengers transported by trolleybus in 2007 amounted to 78.4 million (84.3 million in 2006).

Articulated low-floor bus of the extra-large class Volgabus-6271

In addition, the city operates an electric train route linking the north-western and the southern parts of Yekaterinburg, from Sem' Klyuchey to Elizavet.

=== Rail ===
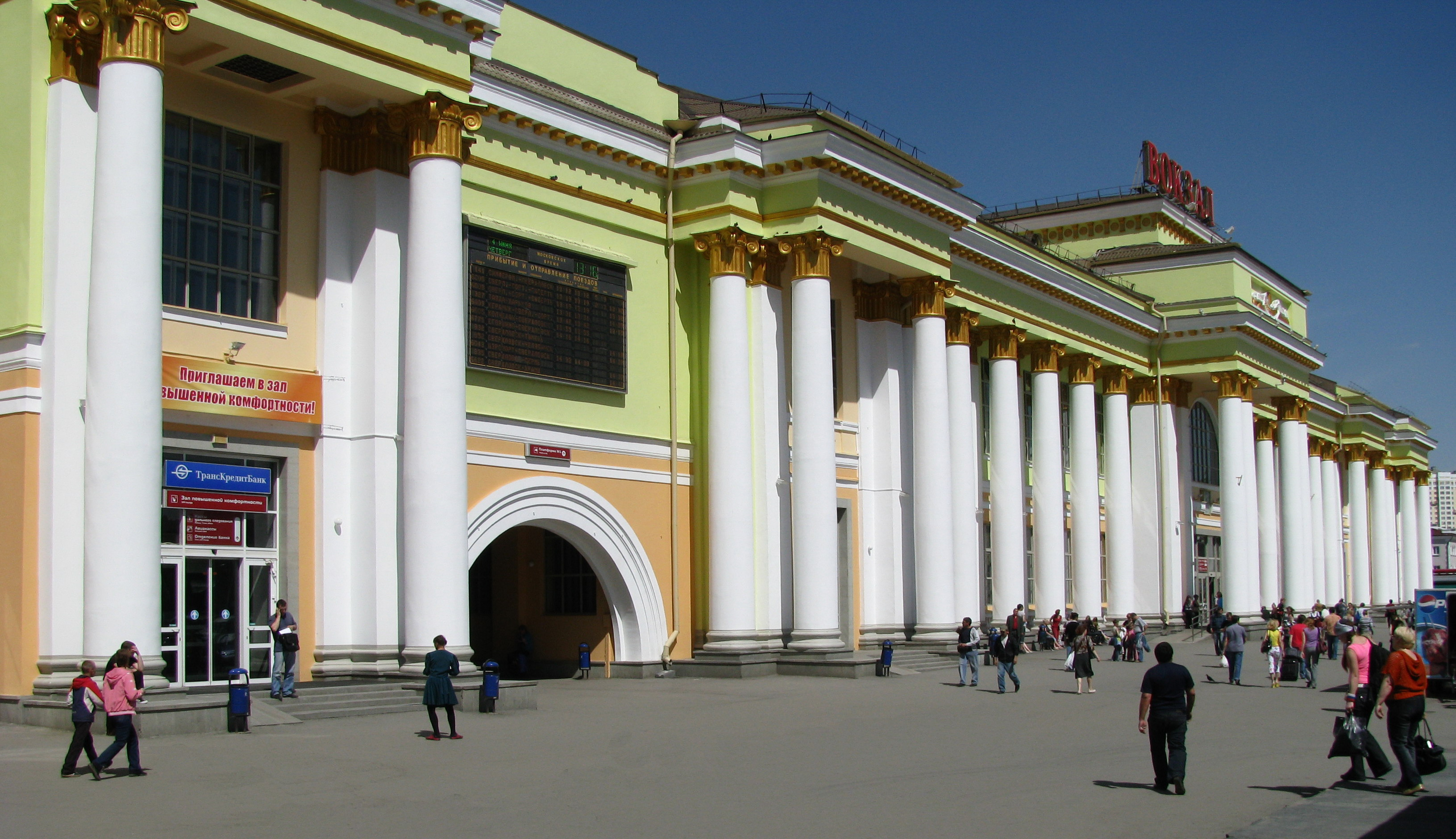
Yekaterinburg railway station

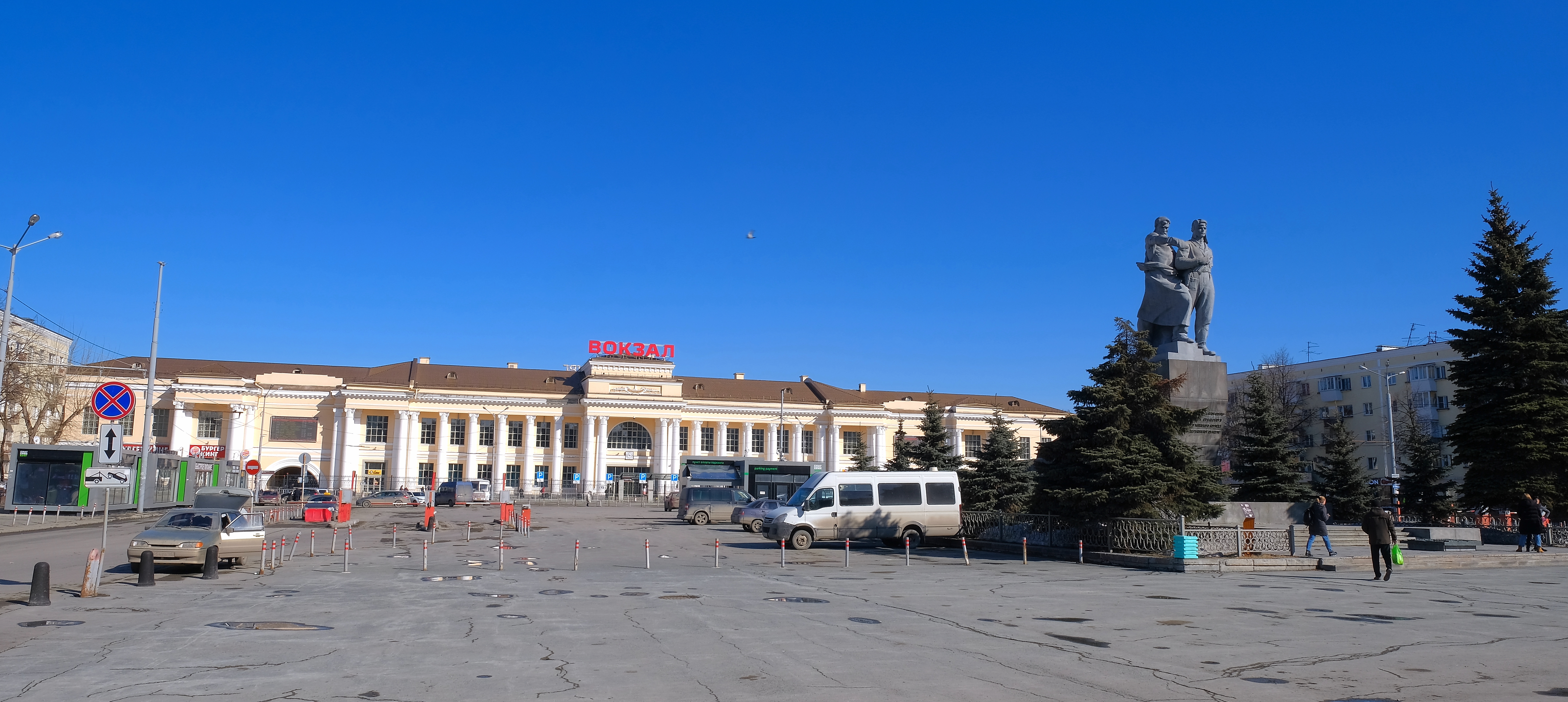
Station Square

Yekaterinburg railway station is a major railway junction. In the Yekaterinburg node, 7 main lines converge (to Perm, Tyumen, Kazan, Nizhny Tagil, Chelyabinsk, Kurgan, and Tavda). The Sverdlovsk Railway Administration is located in the city, which serves trains on the territory of the Sverdlovsk and Tyumen Regions, the Perm Territory, the Khanty-Mansiysk and Yamalo-Nenets Autonomous Districts, as well as parts of the Omsk Region, and there is a single road traffic control centre. The Perm–Yekaterinburg–Tyumen section is now part of the main route of the Trans-Siberian Railway.

=== Air ===
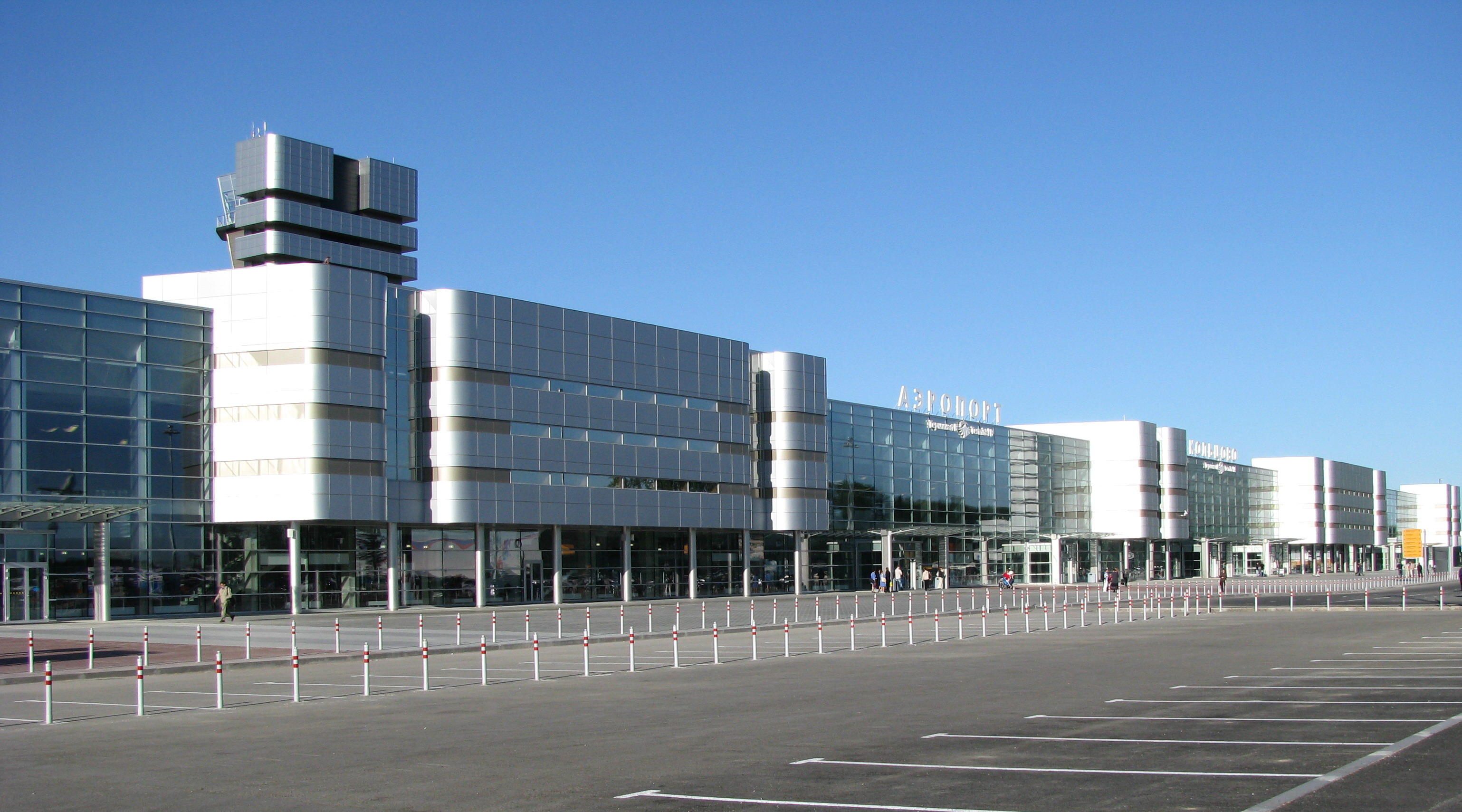
Koltsovo Airport

Yekaterinburg is served by two primary airports: Koltsovo International Airport (SVX) and the smaller Yekaterinburg Aramil Airport. Koltsovo Airport is one of the largest airports in the country, serving 5.404 million passengers (including 3.485 million serviced by domestic airlines, 1.919 million at international flights) in 2017, making it the sixth busiest airport in Russia.

== Health ==
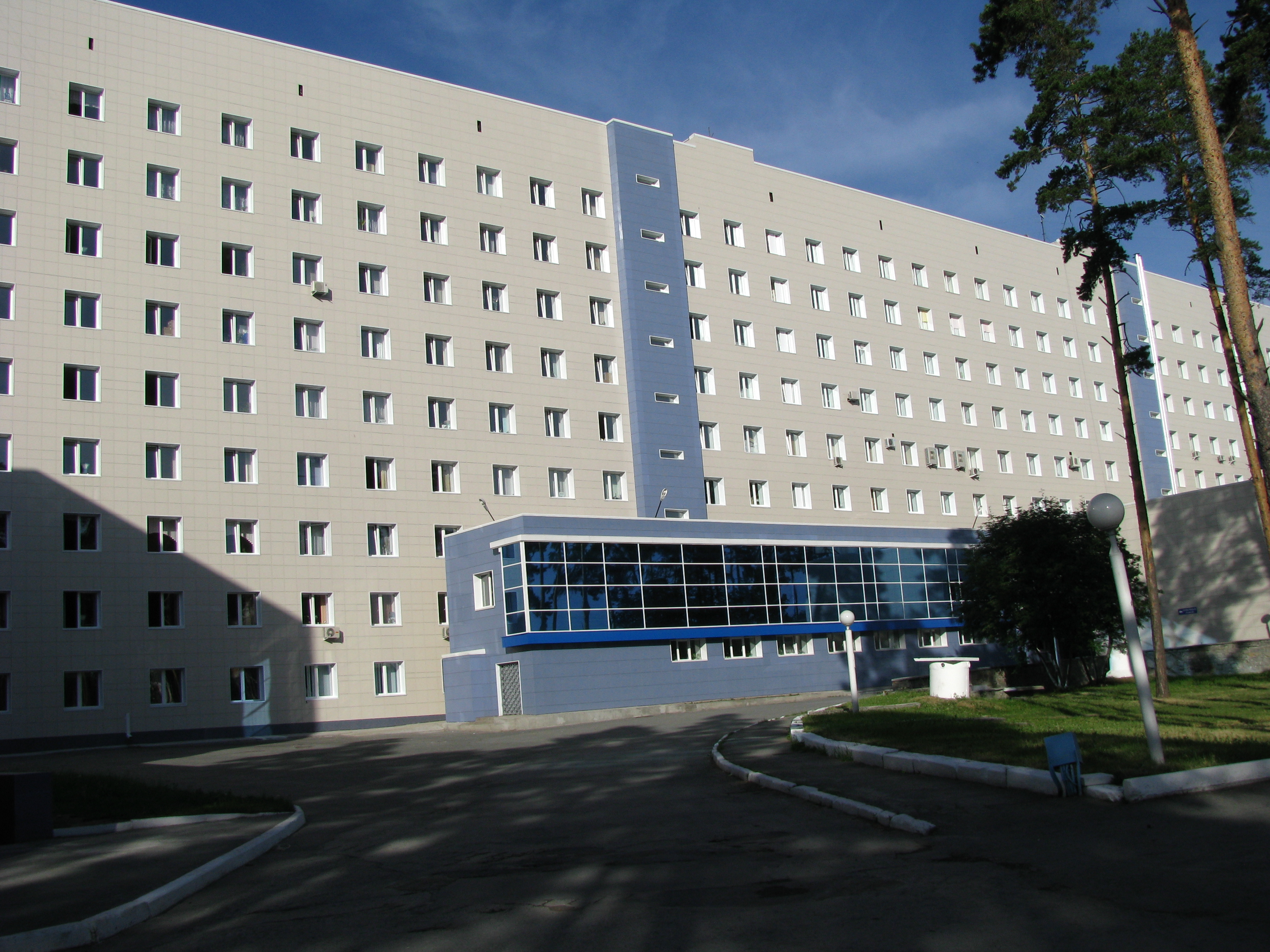
Regional Clinical Hospital No. 1

Yekaterinburg has an extensive network of municipal, regional and federal health facilities. There are 54 hospitals, designed at a capacity of 18,200 beds, 272 ambulatory polyclinics, and 156 dental clinics and offices. Some health facilities are based on medical research institutes such as the Research Institute of Phthisiopulmonology, the Research Institute of Dermatology and Immunopathology, and the Ural State Medical University, as well as others.

In clean areas of the city, there is the Yekaterinburg Medical Centre, which includes the Sverdlovsk Regional Clinical Hospital No. 1 (also includes a polyclinic and a boarding house), Central City Hospital No. 40 (polyclinic, therapeutic building, surgical building, infectious body, neuro-surgical building, maternity hospital), Regional Cardiology Centre, Centre for Prevention and Control of AIDS, and MNTK Eye Microsurgery.

Other large medical centres are the Uralmash Health Centre (Hospital No. 14), the Hospital of veterans of the Great Patriotic War, the district hospital of the Ministry of Internal Affairs, the district military hospital, the Oncology Centre, the Sverdlovsk Oblast Psychiatric Hospital, the Disaster Medicine Centre, the Sanguis Blood Transfusion Centre, children's versatile hospital No. 9, and the regional rehabilitation centre on Chusovsky lake. There are about 300 pharmacies in the city. The number of doctors in public medical institutions is 11,339 people (83.9 per 10,000 people) and the number of nurses is 16,795 (124 per 10,000 people).

Private medical institutions also operate in the city.

== Education ==
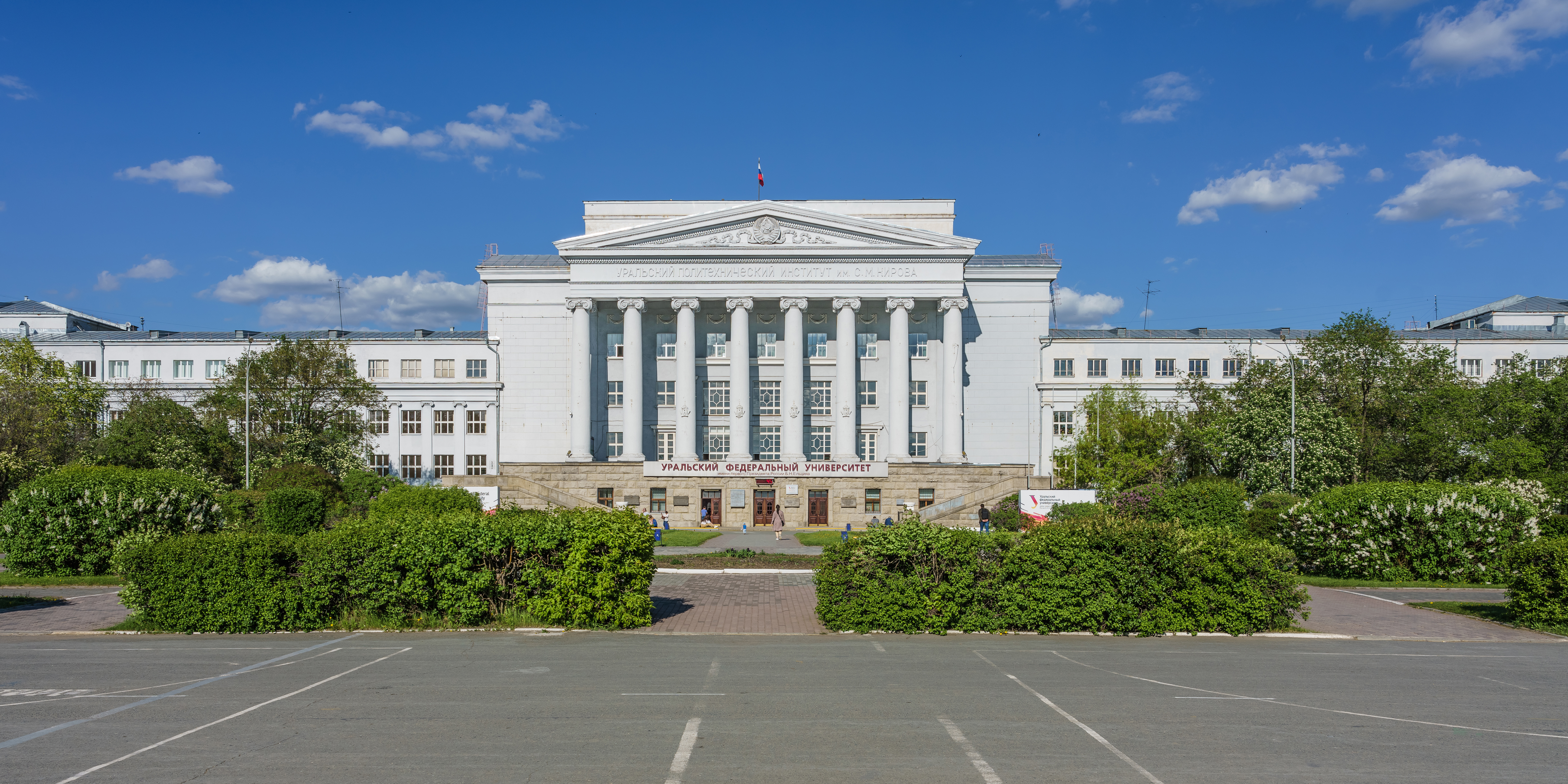
Main building of the Ural Federal University

Yekaterinburg's education system includes institutions of all grades and conditions: preschool, general, special (correctional), and vocational (secondary and higher education), as well as others. Today, the city is one of the largest educational centres of Russia, with Yekaterinburg considered to be the leading educational and scientific centre of the Urals.

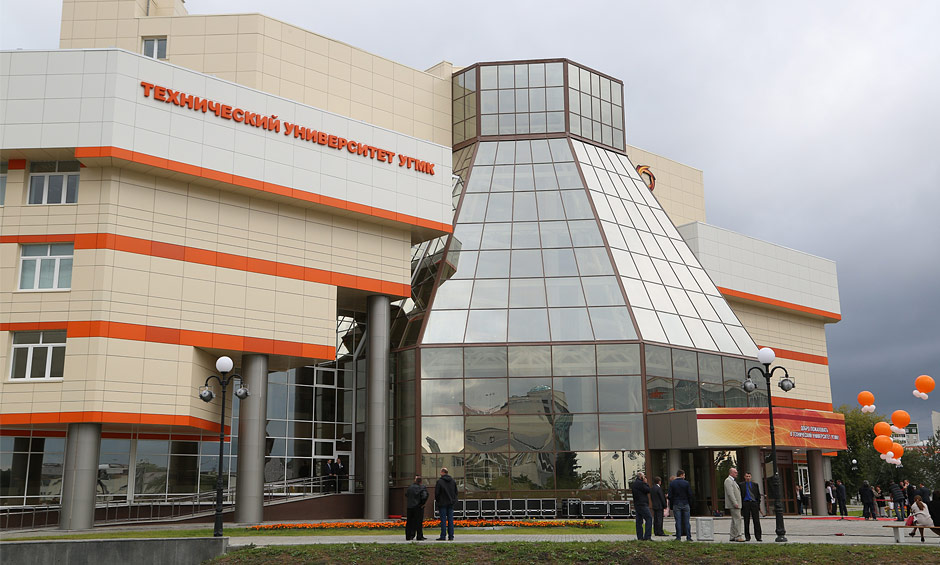
Main building of Technical University of UMMC

There are 164 educational institutions in Yekaterinburg: 160 of them operate in the morning and the other 4 in the evening. In 2015, 133,800 people were enrolled in general education institutions, which holds a capacity of 173,161 people. Yekaterinburg's education system also includes state pre-school educational institutions, non-state pre-school institutions, out-of-town health camps, and municipal city health facilities with a one-day stay. Five educational institutions of the city: SUNC UrFU, Gymnasium No. 2, Gymnasium No. 9, Gymnasium No. 35, and Lyceum No. 135, were included in the rating of the five hundred best schools in the country by the Moscow Center for Continuous Mathematical Education and the Ministry of Education and Science of the Russian Federation.

On 16 July 1914, the Ural Mining Institute of Emperor Nicholas II (now the Ural State Mining University) was established as Yekaterinburg's first educational institution. In 1930, the Sverdlovsk Power Engineering College (now the Ural Technical Institute of Communications and Informatics) was opened to train specialists in the field of communications. The Alexei Maximovich Gorky Ural State University (now the Ural Federal University) became the first university in Yekaterinburg by decree of the Council of People's Commissars of the RSFSR, signed by Vladimir Lenin on 19 October 1920. The Sverdlovsk Engineering and Pedagogical Institute (today the Russian State Vocational and Pedagogical University) became the first university of the USSR for the training of engineering and pedagogical personnel when it was opened in 1979.

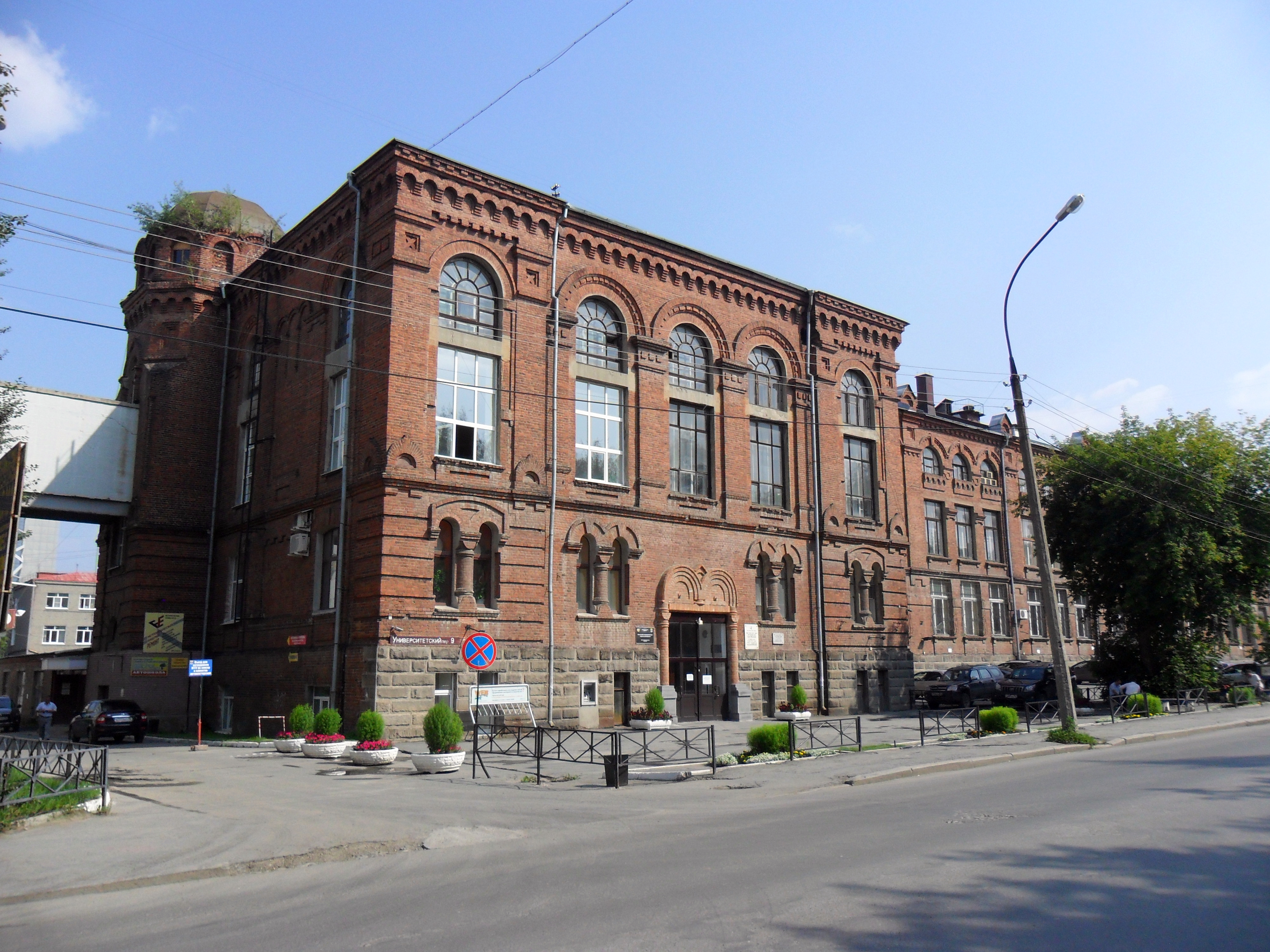
Ural State Mining University

In terms of the level of qualification of the graduates, Yekaterinburg's universities are among the leading in Russia, in particular in terms of the number of graduates representing the current managing elite of the country, Yekaterinburg universities are second only to the educational institutions of Moscow and Saint Petersburg. Currently, there are 20 state universities in the city, which currently holds a total of 140,000 students. In addition, there are 14 non-state institutions of higher education in the city, such as the Yekaterinburg Academy of Contemporary Art and the Yekaterinburg Theological Seminary. The prestigious architecture school, the Ural State Academy of Architecture and Arts, is also located within the city limits. Other institutions of higher education Ural State Pedagogical University, Ural State University of Forestry, Ural State University of Railway Transport, Ural State University of Economics, Military Institute of Artillery, Ural State Conservatory, Ural State Agricultural Academy, Ural State Law Academy, Ural State Medical University, Ural State Academy of Performing Arts, Ural Academy of Public Service, and Institute of International Relations.

In May 2011, the Ural State University and Ural State Technical University merged to form the Boris N. Yeltsin Ural Federal University, making it the largest university in the Urals and the largest university in Russia. As of 1 January 2016, the university had 35,300 students and 2,950 teachers. The university's budget in 2015 totalled 9,1 billion rubles and the volume of research and development work totalled 1,6 billion rubles. As of 2021, UrFU is the largest university in Russia in terms of the number of students, being on the 351st place in the QS World University Rankings. The number of publications of the university in the Web of Science database is about a thousand per year.

There are many branches of non-resident universities in the city, including the Ural branch of the Siberian State University of Telecommunications and Informatics, the Ural branch of the Russian Academy of Private Law, the Yekaterinburg branch of the Plekhanov Russian Economic Academy, the Yekaterinburg branch of the University of the Russian Academy of Education, the Yekaterinburg branch of the Moscow State University, and Sholokhov Humanitarian University, as well as others.

== Media and telecommunications ==
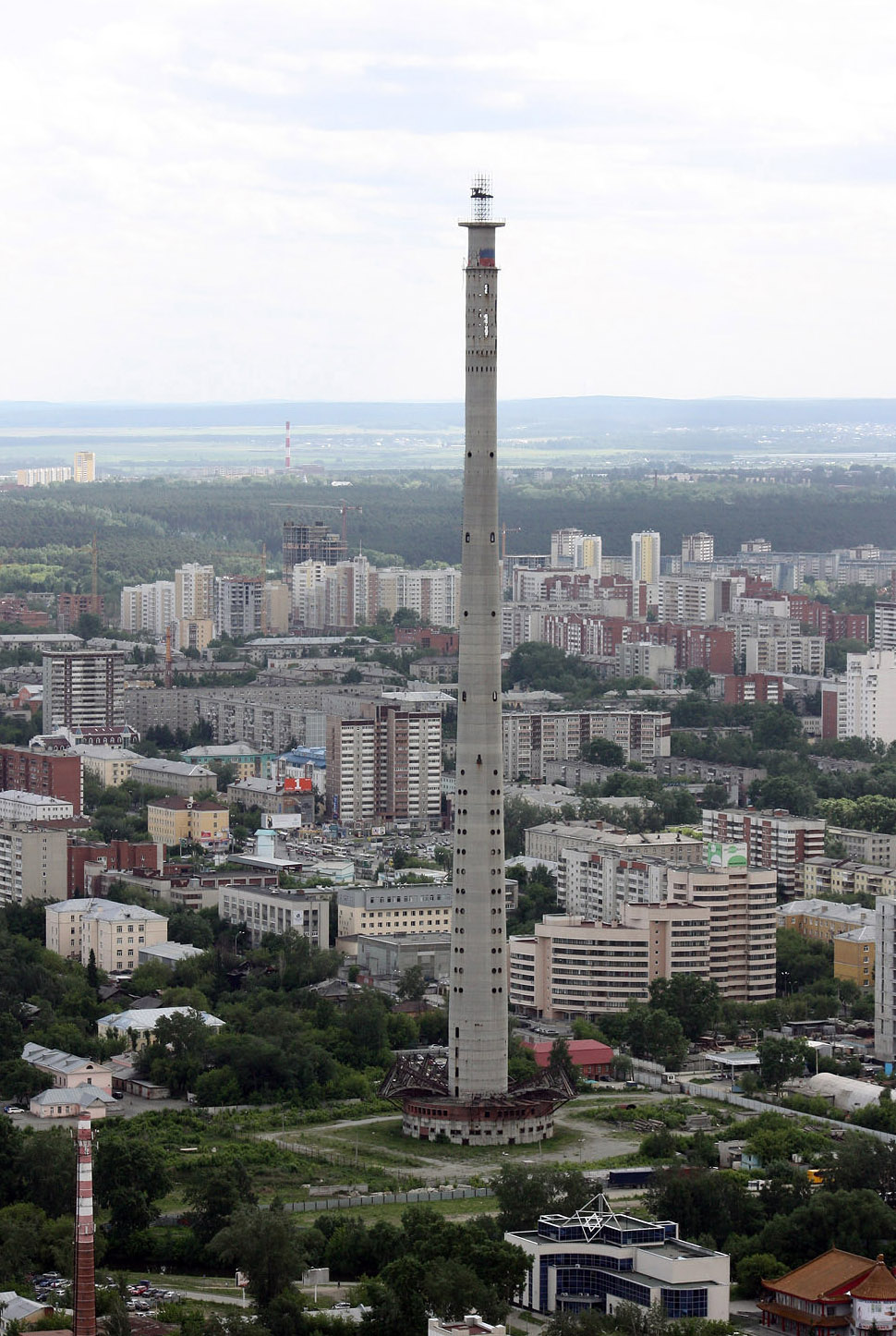
Yekaterinburg TV Tower before it was demolished

In Yekaterinburg, a large number of print publications are published: about 200 newspapers, the most read being the Ural Worker, Vecherny Yekaterinburg, Oblastnaya Gazeta, and For Change!, and 70 magazines, with most read being Red Burda and I'm Buying.

A television studio was built in Yekaterinburg (as Sverdlovsk) in 1955 and on 6 November of the same year, the first telecast appeared. Coloured television later appeared in 1976. Now the television is broadcast by 19 companies, including but not all: STRC Ural, Channel Four, 41 Home, Channel 10, OTV, Union (Orthodox), and UFO 24. Broadcasting is carried out from the TV tower on Lunacharsky street (television studio GTRK Ural), the TV tower on the Moskovskiy Hill, and from the TV tower (radio relay tower) on Blyukher Street. In 1981, construction of a new television tower was started, which was to become the second tallest in Russia after the Ostankino Tower and cover the territory of most of the Sverdlovsk region, but economic difficulties postponed construction. As a result, the television tower was the tallest uncompleted structure in the world. On 24 March 2018, the television tower was demolished by detonation for the city's beautification in preparation of the 2018 FIFA World Cup. The Shartash radio mast, which broadcasts, is the tallest structure in the city, with a height of 263 meters. In addition, several dozens of national and local news agencies are broadcast in Yekaterinburg, with the most watched being ITAR-TASS Ural, RUIA-Ural, and Interfax-Ural.

At the moment, there are 26 internet providers and 6 cellular operators in the city. According to Yekaterinburg News, the city has signed a cooperative agreement with the Russian mobile operator Vimpelcom, working under the Beeline brand. The partnership will involve cooperation on investment projects and social programmes focused on increasing access to mobile services in the city. Beeline has launched an initiative to provide Wi-Fi services in 500 public trams and trolley buses in Yekaterinburg.

Operators of mobile communication in Yekaterinburg
Generation	Mobile communication standard	Operators
2G	GSM	MTS, MegaFon, Beeline, Tele2 Russia, Motive
2.5G	GPRS	MTS, MegaFon, Beeline, Tele2 Russia, Motive
2.75G	EDGE	MTS, MegaFon, Beeline, Tele2 Russia, Motive
3G	UMTS, CDMA 1X	MTS, MegaFon, Beeline, Tele2 Russia
3.5G	HSPA	MTS, MegaFon, Beeline, Tele2 Russia
3.75G	HSPA+	MTS, MegaFon, Beeline, Tele2 Russia
4G	LTE	MTS, MegaFon, Beeline, Tele2 Russia, Motive, Yota
4G+	LTE Advanced	MTS, MegaFon, Beeline, Yota

== Life and culture ==
=== Overview ===
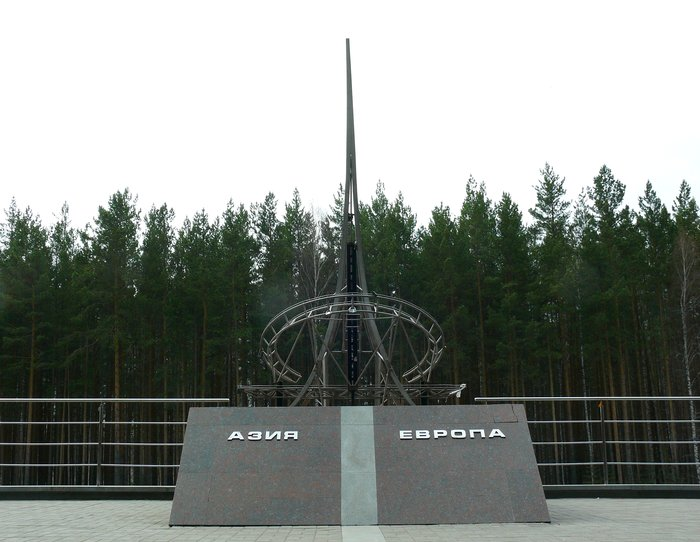
Europe-Asia border marker near Yekaterinburg

Yekaterinburg is a multipurpose cultural centre of the Urals Federal District. There are about fifty libraries in the city. The largest library organisations are the Sverdlovsk Oblast Universal Scientific Library, the V.G. Belinsky Scientific Library, which is the largest public library in Sverdlovsk Oblast, and the Municipal Library Association, which is composed of 41 libraries throughout the city, including the AI Herzen Central City Library.

There are about 50 different museums in the city. Yekaterinburg has unique museum collections, such as the collections of Russian paintings in the Yekaterinburg Museum of Fine Arts and the Nevyansk icons in the Nevyansk Icon Museum, with more than 300 icons representing the eighteenth through the twentieth centuries on display. There is also a unique exhibit, the Kaslinsky cast iron pavilion, which received main awards at the 1900 World Exhibition in Paris. The Kasli Pavilion was registered by UNESCO as the only cast-iron architectural structure in the world, which is in the museum collection. Museums of the city also have collections of jewellery and stone ornaments. The United Museum of Writers of the Urals presents exhibitions in memory of writers such as Dmitry Mamin-Sibiryak and Pavel Bazhov. It also is the home of the Shigirskaya Kladovaya (Шигирская кладовая), or Shigir Collection, which includes the oldest known wooden sculpture in the world. The sculpture was found near Nevyansk and originally estimated to have been made approximately 9,500 years ago, but now is estimated to have been made 11,500 years ago. Yekaterinburg museums annually participate in the international event Long Night of Museums.

Yekaterinburg has the third most theatres in Russia. The influence of theatrical life of the city was made by the Moscow Art Academic Theater and the Central Theater of the Soviet Army when they evacuated to Yekaterinburg (as Sverdlovsk) during World War II, and they had their own theater in the city. Notable theatres that operate in the city are Academic Theater of Musical Comedy, Drama Theater, Kolyada-Theater, the youth theatre, and the puppet theatre, as well as others. The Yekaterinburg Opera and Ballet Theater received four awards at the Golden Mask 2020 Festival in Moscow, including the main Golden Mask for the Best Opera Performance.

In 2014, the city showcased its education, literary, art, and theatre culture through the Russian Year of Culture Programme.

The city has a well-developed film industry. Opened back in 1909, Laurage was the first cinema in Yekaterinburg. In 1943, the Sverdlovsk Film Studio was opened and produced its first feature film Silva a year later. After the Second World War, the studio produced up to ten feature films a year. There are more than 20 cinemas in Yekaterinburg, the oldest of which is the Salyut, while the most capacious is the Cosmos spacecraft. There are also chains of movie theatres such as Premier-Zal, Kinomaks, and Kinoplex, which usually open in shopping and entertainment centres.

A number of popular Russian rock bands, such as Urfin Dzhyus, Chaif, Chicherina, Nautilus Pompilius, Nastya, Trek, Agata Kristi, Slaughter to Prevail and Smyslovye Gallyutsinatsii, were originally formed in Yekaterinburg (Ural Rock is often considered as a particular variety of rock music. Yekaterinburg and St. Petersburg are actually considered to be the main centres of the genre in Russia). Also, opera singers like Boris Shtokolov, Yuri Gulyayev, Vera Bayeva graduated from the Urals State Conservatory. The Ural Philharmonic Orchestra (currently conducted by Dmitry Liss), founded by Mark Paverman and located in Yekaterinburg, is also very popular in Russia and in Europe, as well as the Ural Academic Popular Chorus, a folk-singing and dance ensemble.

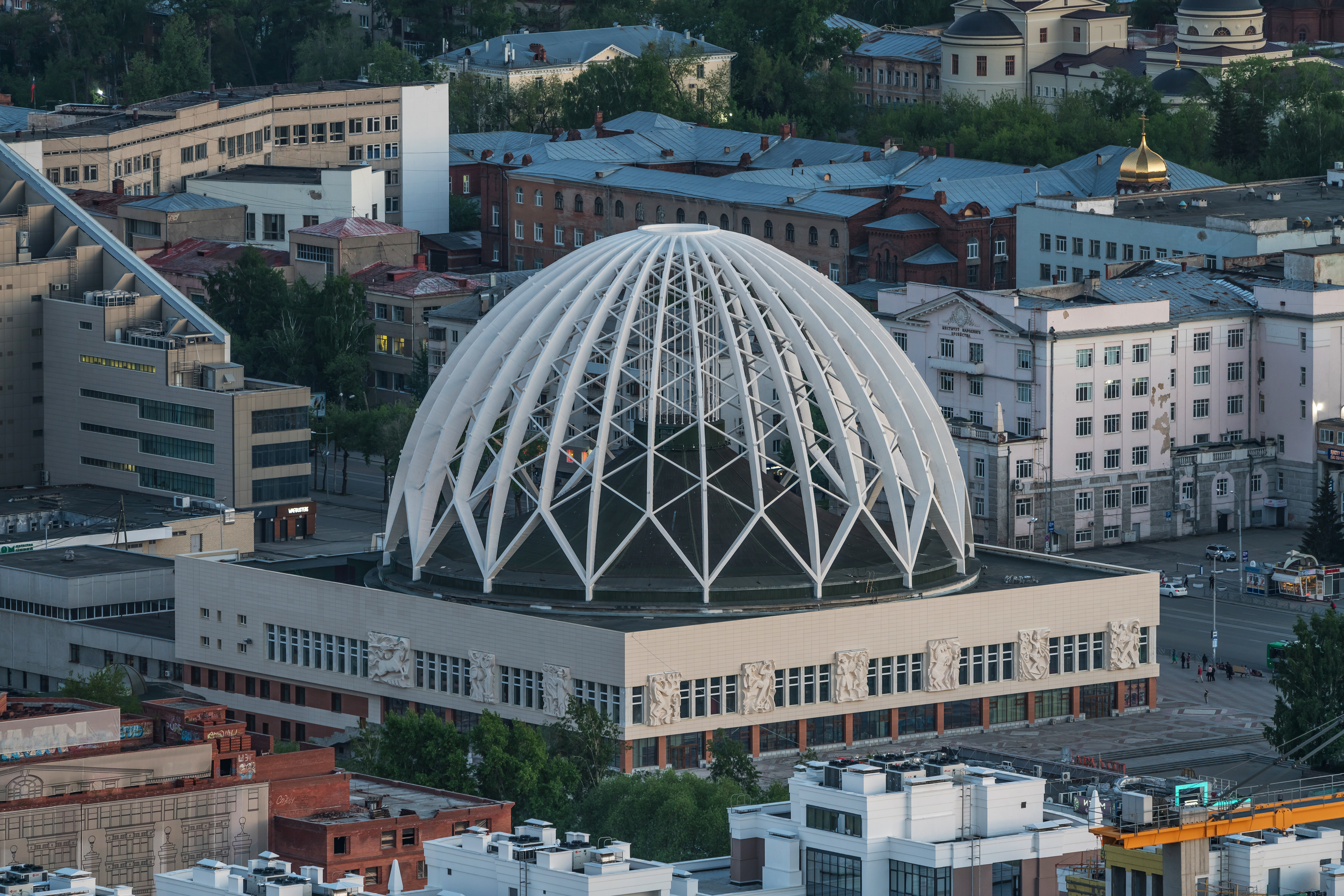
Yekaterinburg Circus.

Yekaterinburg V. I. Filatov State Circus is located in the centre of the city, on the western bank of the Iset River. In 2012, the Yekaterinburg Circus was nominated "Best Circus of the Year" for the circus show Sharivari by the Rosgoscirk and the Ministry of Culture.

The Presidential Center named after Boris Yeltsin was built in Yekaterinburg in 2015. It is considered to be a public, cultural and educational center. The Center has its art gallery, library, museum equipped with the newest multimedia technologies that help to present the documents, video materials and archive photos. In 2017, the Yeltsin Center was recognized as the best museum in Europe by the Council of Europe, the first of the museums in Russia.

The Urals Society of Natural Science Lovers pushed Yekaterinburg to have a zoo. Currently, the zoo has more than 1,000 animals that belong to more than 350 species. The zoo covers an area of 2.7 hectares.

On 18 June 2011, Yekaterinburg launched Red Line as a pedestrian tourist route for self-guided tours by residents and visitors to go to 34 landmarks in the historical section of the city.

=== Architecture ===
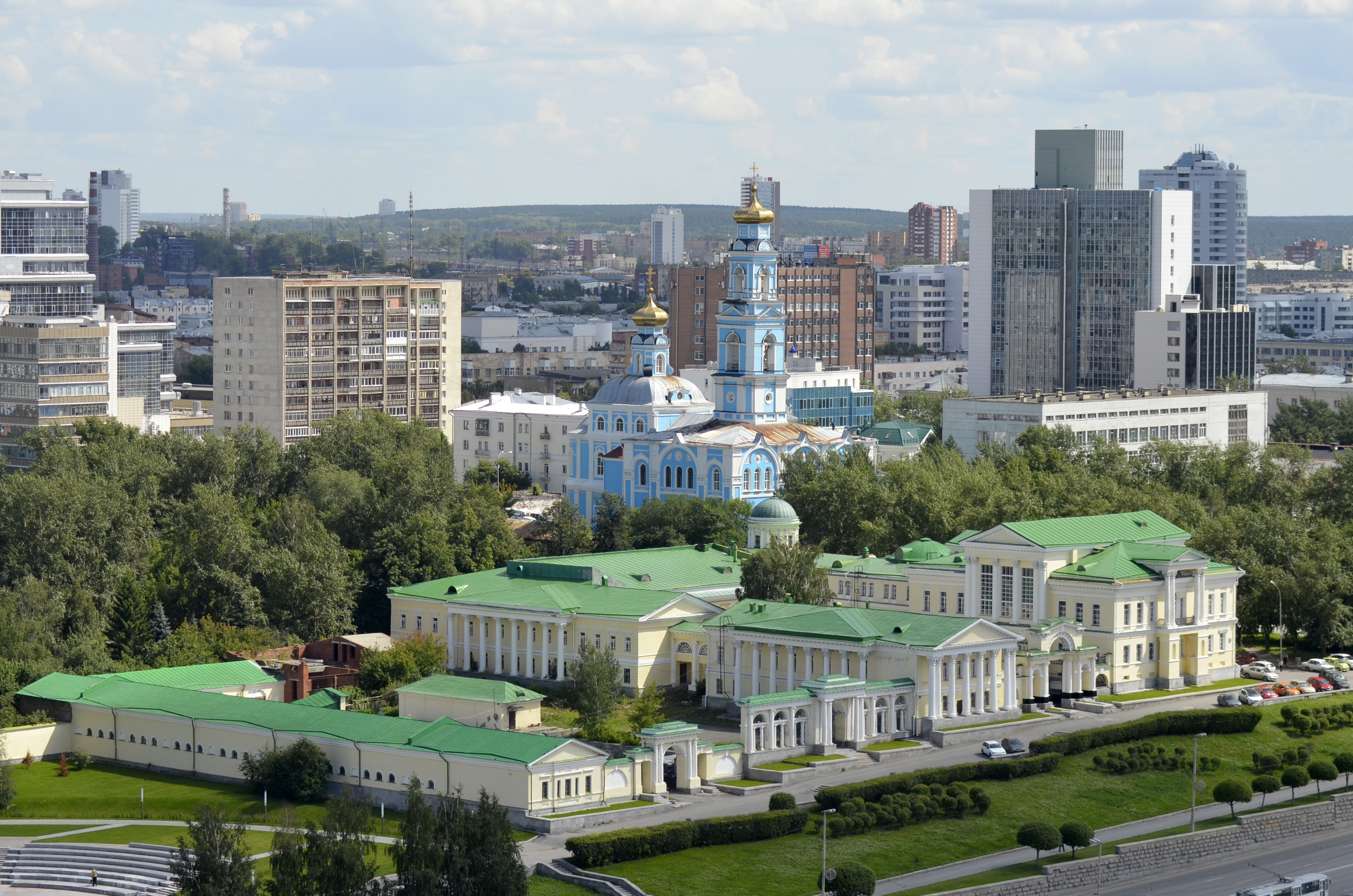
The Rastorguyev-Kharitonov Palace, built from 1794 to 1820

Many buildings of Yekaterinburg are ranged from a different number of architectural styles. The city had a regular layout, based on the fortresses of the Renaissance and by the principles of French town planning during the 17th century. By the 18th century, the Baroque movement was not that influential in Yekaterinburg, with the style being seen in churches which later declined.

In the first half of the 19th century, neoclassicism grew influential in the Yekaterinburg's architecture. The estates were built in the neoclassic style, including the main house, wings, services, and often an English-style park. This style's influence in Yekaterinburg is mostly due to the contributions of architect Michael Malakhov, who worked in the city from 1815 to 1842. He designed the assemblies of the Verkhne-Isetsky factory as well as the Novo-Tikhvinsky Monastery.

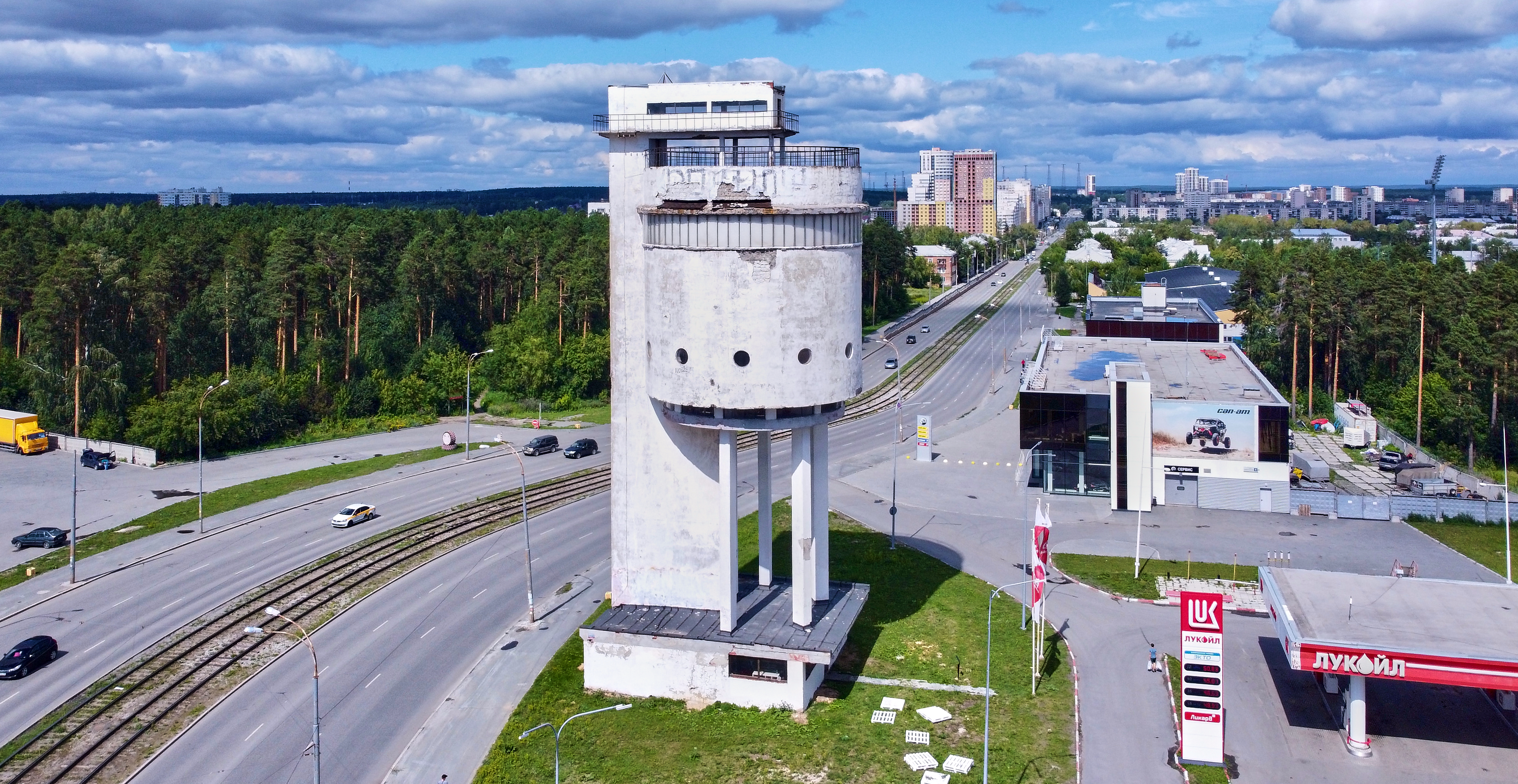
White Tower of the Ural Heavy Machinery Plant

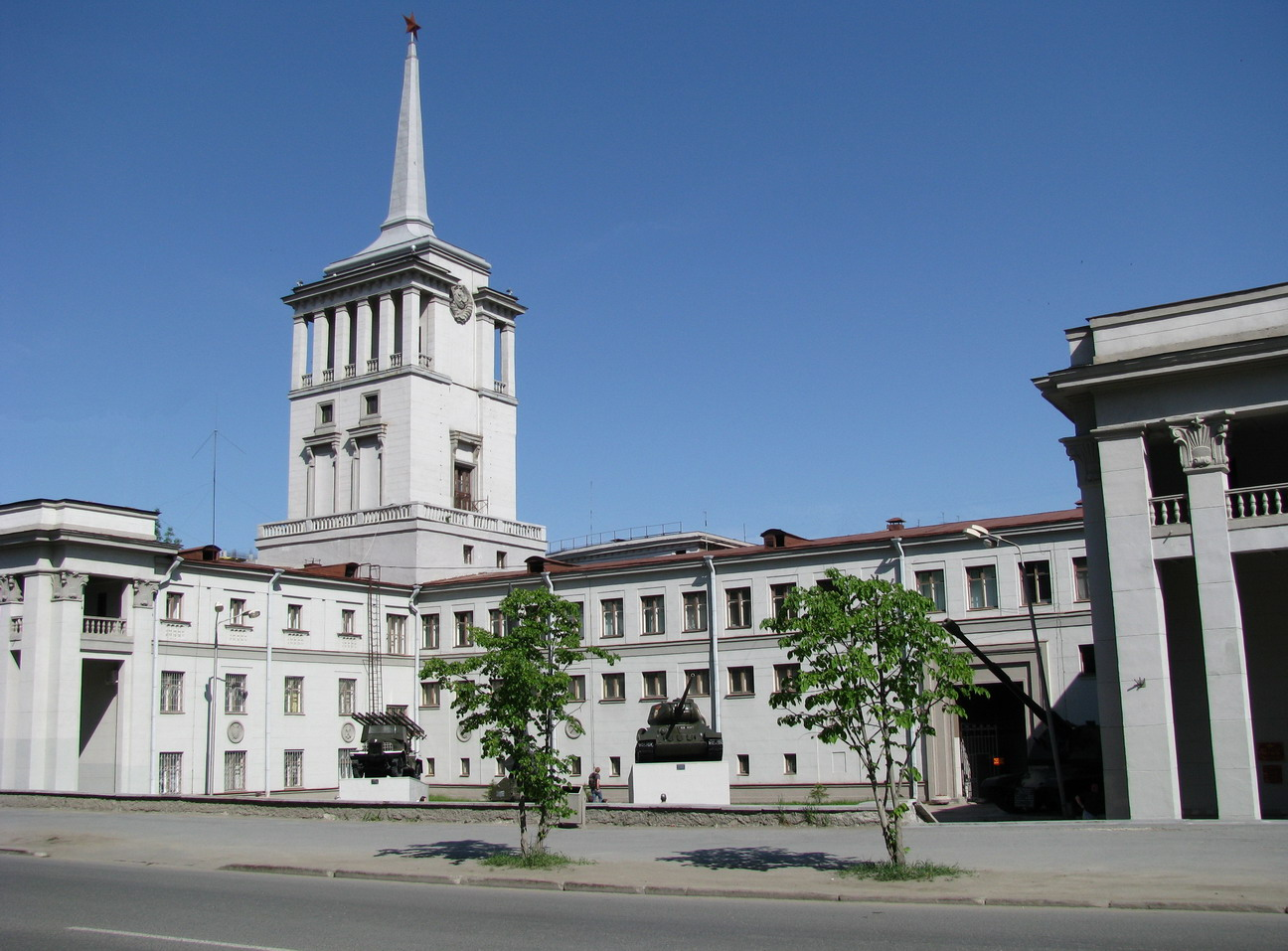
District Officers' House

At the beginning of the 20th century, eclecticism became a dominant influence in Yekaterinburg's architecture. Buildings such as the Opera House and Yekaterinburg railway station were built in this style. During the 1920s and the 1930s, constructivism took effect, influencing residential complexes, industrial buildings, stadiums, etc. Architects Moses Ginzburg, Jacob Kornfeld, the Vesnina brothers, Daniel Friedman, and Sigismund Dombrovsky contributed greatly to the constructivism in the city. More than 140 structures in Yekaterinburg are designed in the constructivist style, including the Uralmash White Tower and the building of the printing house of the "Uralskiy Rabochiy" publishing house.

During the 1930s to 1950s, there was a turn back to neoclassicism, with much attention paid to public buildings and monuments. Notable examples include the buildings of the Ural Industrial Institute on Lenin Avenue, the City Party Committee and the City Council Executive Committee building (now the City Administrative building), the District Officers' House, and the House of Defense complex. Cultural buildings are built in the squares in orderly composition. In these years, architects Golubev, K. T. Babykin, Valenkov worked fruitfully in Yekaterinburg with this style. In the 1960s, changes in the approach to construction led to widespread distribution of apartment blocks common in the Khrushchev era. Buildings built by individuals were rare, among them being: KKT "Kosmos", the Palace of Youth, and DK UZTM.

From the 1960s to the 1980s, as industrial development grew in Yekaterinburg, so did rationalism. The situation changed in the 1990s when Russia transferred into a market economy. At that time, older buildings were restored, giving the urban area a new environment such as: the Cosmos Concert Hall, the Puppet Theater, the children's ballet theatre The Nutcracker, the Palace of Justice, the Cathedral of the Blood, and the Church of the Transfiguration. At the same time, the construction of new buildings was accompanied by the demolition of historical buildings, leading to the development of the "facade" phenomenon, where the facades of historic buildings are preserved while adjacent modern buildings are built.

The centre of Yekaterinburg became the centre of new construction, where banks, business centres, hotels, luxury residential complexes, and sports and shopping centres were built. High-tech architecture grew influential, with buildings such as the Center for Railway Transportation Management, the Summit business centre, the Aquamarine residential complex, and the retail strip at Vaynera Street being notable examples. Along with this, postmodernism revived interest in the older architectural styles of Yekaterinburg, growing more emphasis on historicalism and contextualism. In the late 1990s, architects grew interested in regionalism.

Construction site in Yekaterinburg

At the beginning of the 21st century, Yekaterinburg architects turned back to the Soviet-based avant-garde, and influence future city buildings with the neoconstructivist style. The practice of attracting large foreign investors to projects has become popular. In 2007, the construction of the Central business district started, being headed by the French architect Jean Pistre. In 2010, Yekaterinburg became one of the largest centers for the construction of High-rise buildings. In the city, 1,189 high-rise buildings were built, including 20 skyscrapers, the tallest of which is the Iset Tower, with a height of 209 meters.

=== Sports ===
Yekaterinburg is also a leading sports centre in Russia. A large number of well-known athletes, both world and Olympics champions, are associated with the city. Since 1952, Yekaterinburg athletes have won 137 medals at the Olympic Games (46 gold, 60 silver and 31 bronze). In the 2008 Summer Olympics, 8 residents of Yekaterinburg returned with medals (1 gold, 3 silver and 4 bronze).

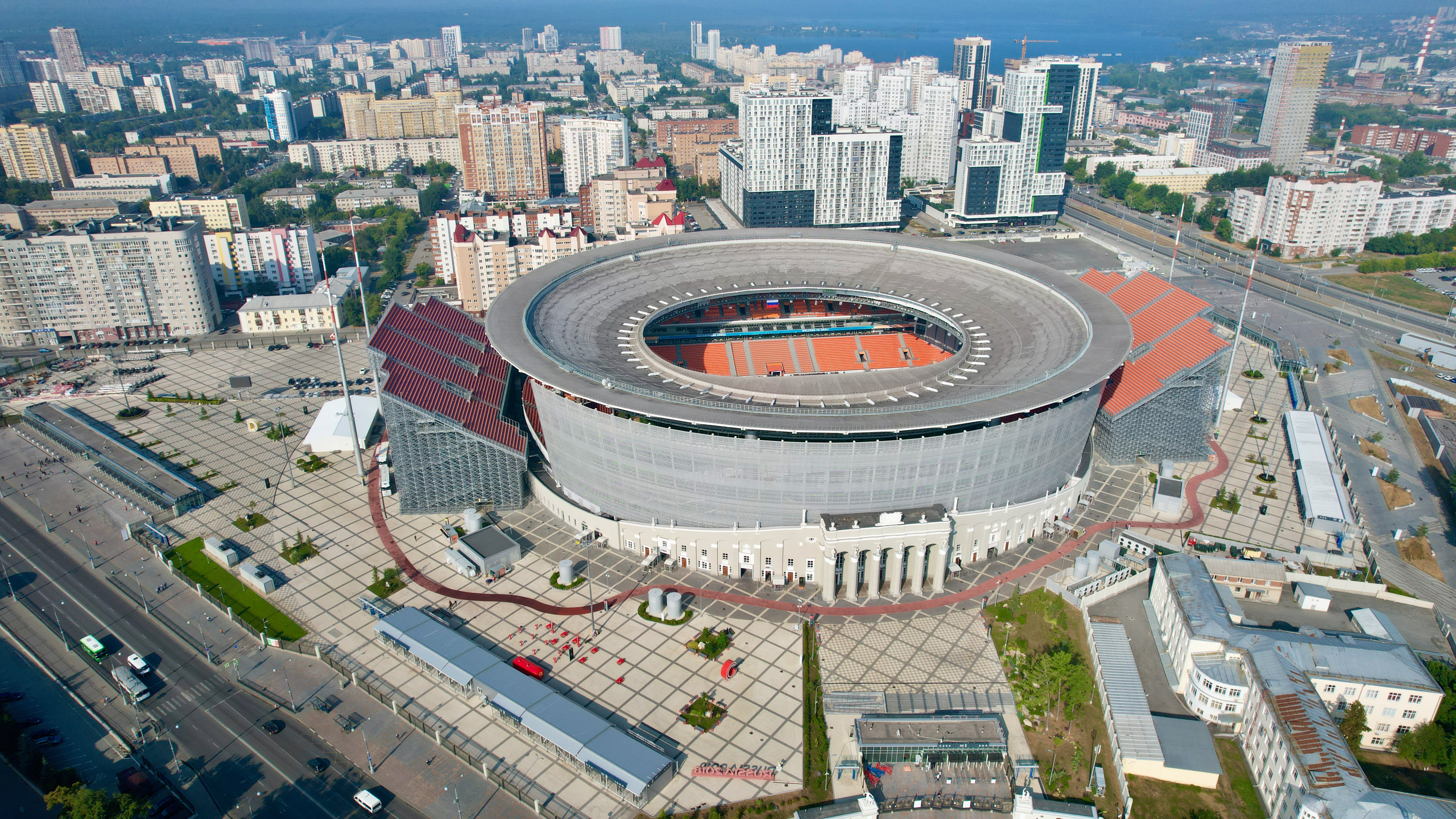
Yekaterinburg Arena (formerly Central Stadium)

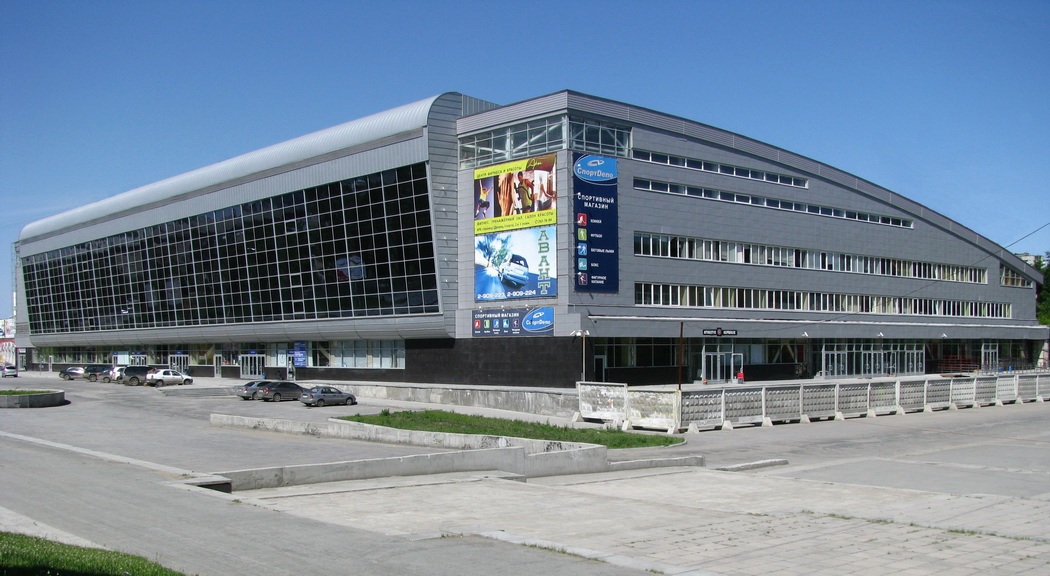
Uralets Arena (formerly Sports Palace)

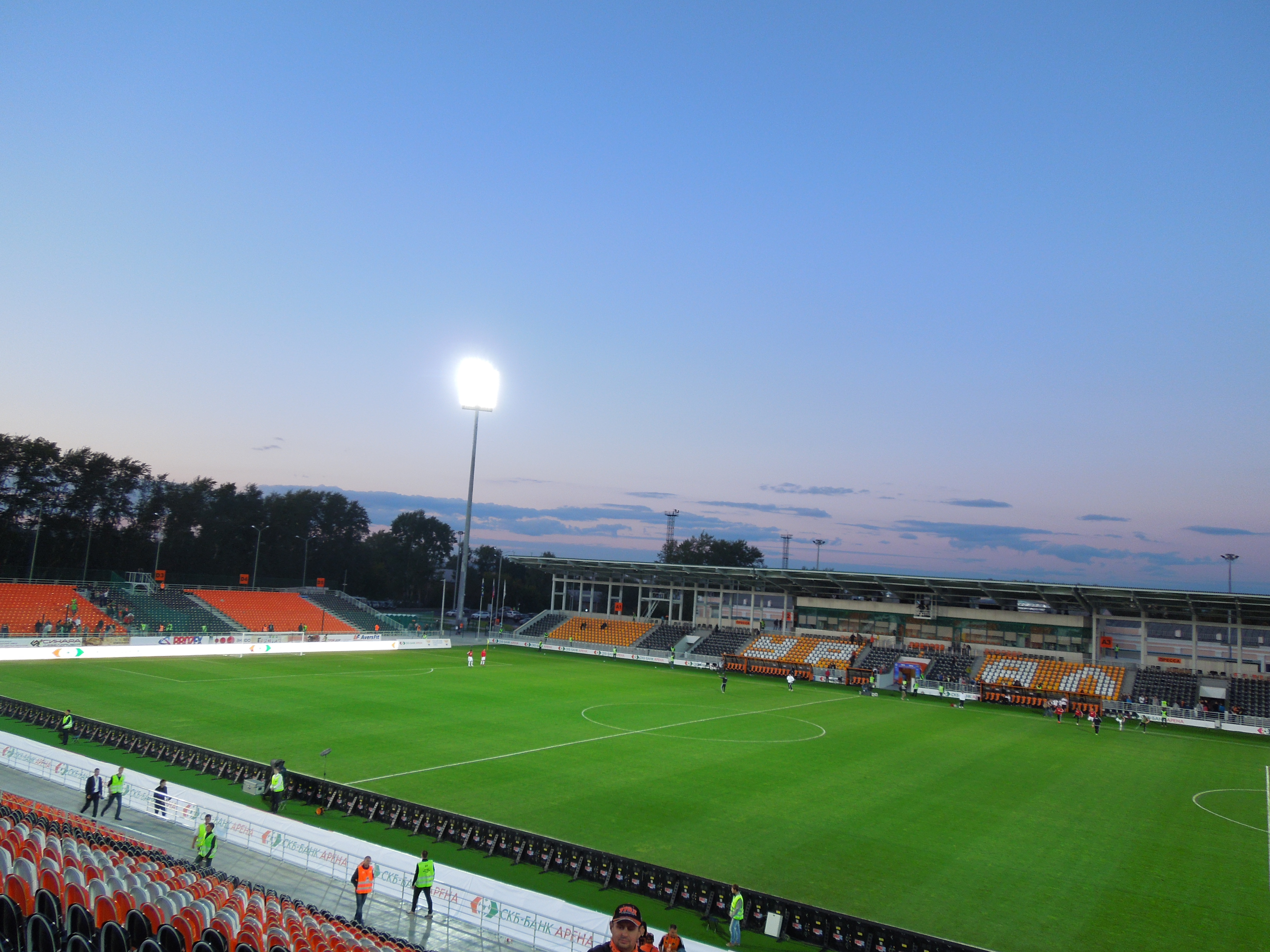
Uralmash Stadium

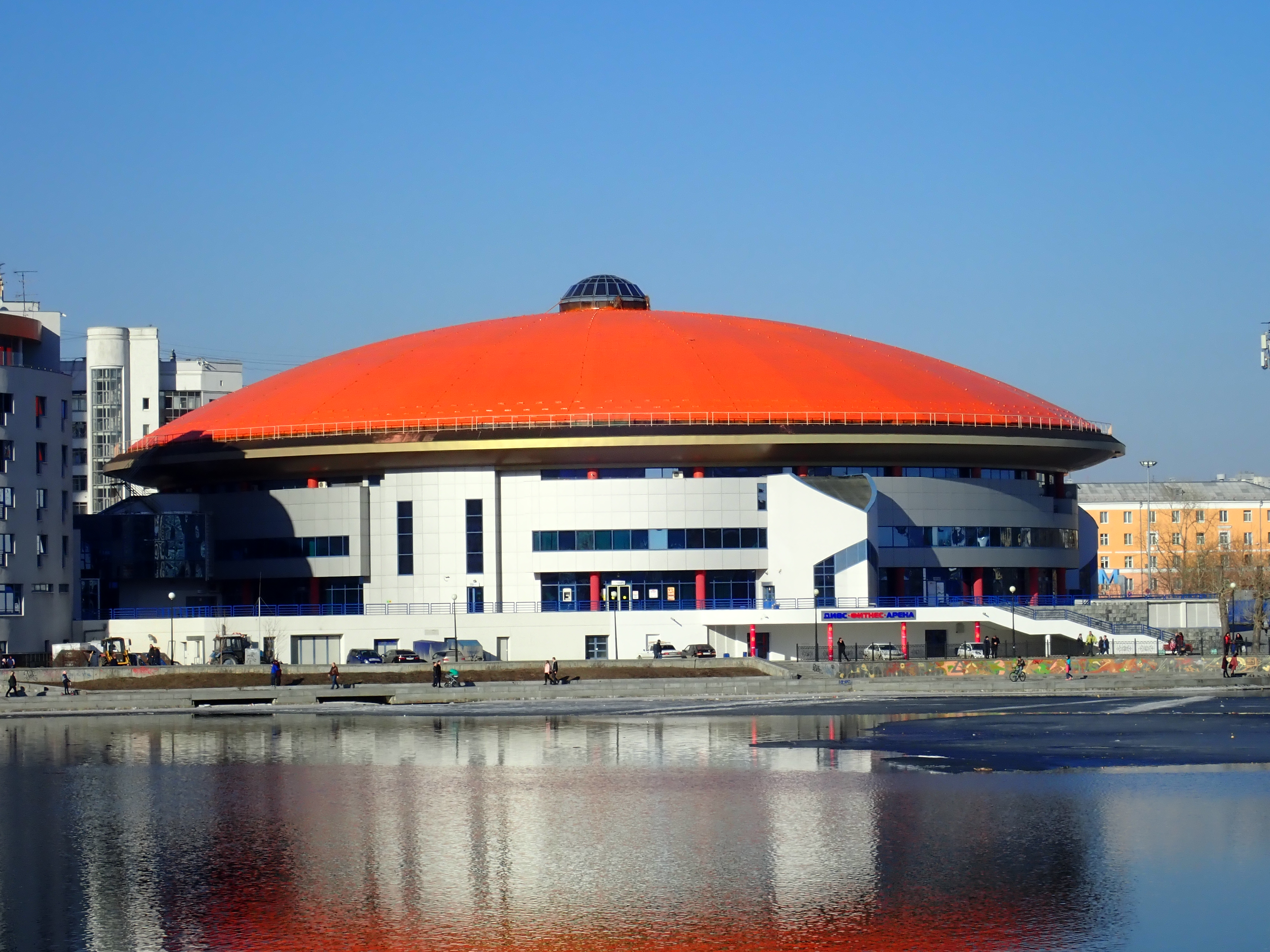
Palace of Sporting Games

In 1965, Yekaterinburg (as Sverdlovsk), along with a number of Russian cities, hosted the Bandy World Championship. In 2018, Yekaterinburg was one of the 11 Russian cities that hosted the 2018 FIFA World Cup. The matches were played on the upgraded Yekaterinburg Arena (called Central Stadium before the World Cup).

Yekaterinburg has a total of 1728 sports facilities, including 16 stadiums with stands, 440 indoor gyms and 45 swimming pools. There are 38 sports children's and youth schools for reserves for the Olympic Games, in which more than 30,000 people are participating.

==== Sport clubs ====
Yekaterinburg has many professional sports clubs in sports such as volleyball, basketball, futsal, bandy, and ice hockey for both women and men. Bandy club SKA-Sverdlovsk, women's volleyball club VC Uralochka-NTMK, women's basketball club UMMC Yekaterinburg, and futsal club MFK Sinara Yekaterinburg were among the best teams in Russia and Europe.

Club	Sport	Founded	Current league	League Tier	Stadium
Ural Yekaterinburg	Association football	1930	Russian Premier League	1st	Central Stadium
Avtomobilist Yekaterinburg	Ice Hockey	2006	Kontinental Hockey League	1st	UMMC Arena
Avto Yekaterinburg	Ice Hockey	2009	Minor Hockey League	Jr. 1st	KRK Uralets
Spartak-Merkury	Ice Hockey	1992	Women's Hockey Championship	1st	Sports Palace Snezhinka
Uralsky Trubnik	Bandy	1937	Russian Bandy Super League	1st	Uralsky Trubnik Stadium
SKA-Sverdlovsk	Bandy	1935	Russian Bandy Supreme League	2nd	Uralsky Trubnik Stadium
Ural Yekaterinburg	Basketball	2006	Russian Basketball Super League	2nd	Palace of Sporting Games
UGMK Yekaterinburg	Basketball	1938	Women's Basketball Premier League	1st	Palace of Sporting Games
Lokomotiv-Izumrud Yekaterinburg	Volleyball	1945	Volleyball Supreme League A	2nd	Palace of Sporting Games
Uralochka Yekaterinburg	Volleyball	1966	Women's Volleyball Superleague	1st	Palace of Sporting Games; Metallurg-Forum
Sinara Yekaterinburg	Futsal	1992	Futsal Super League	1st	Palace of Sporting Games

==== 2018 FIFA World Cup ====
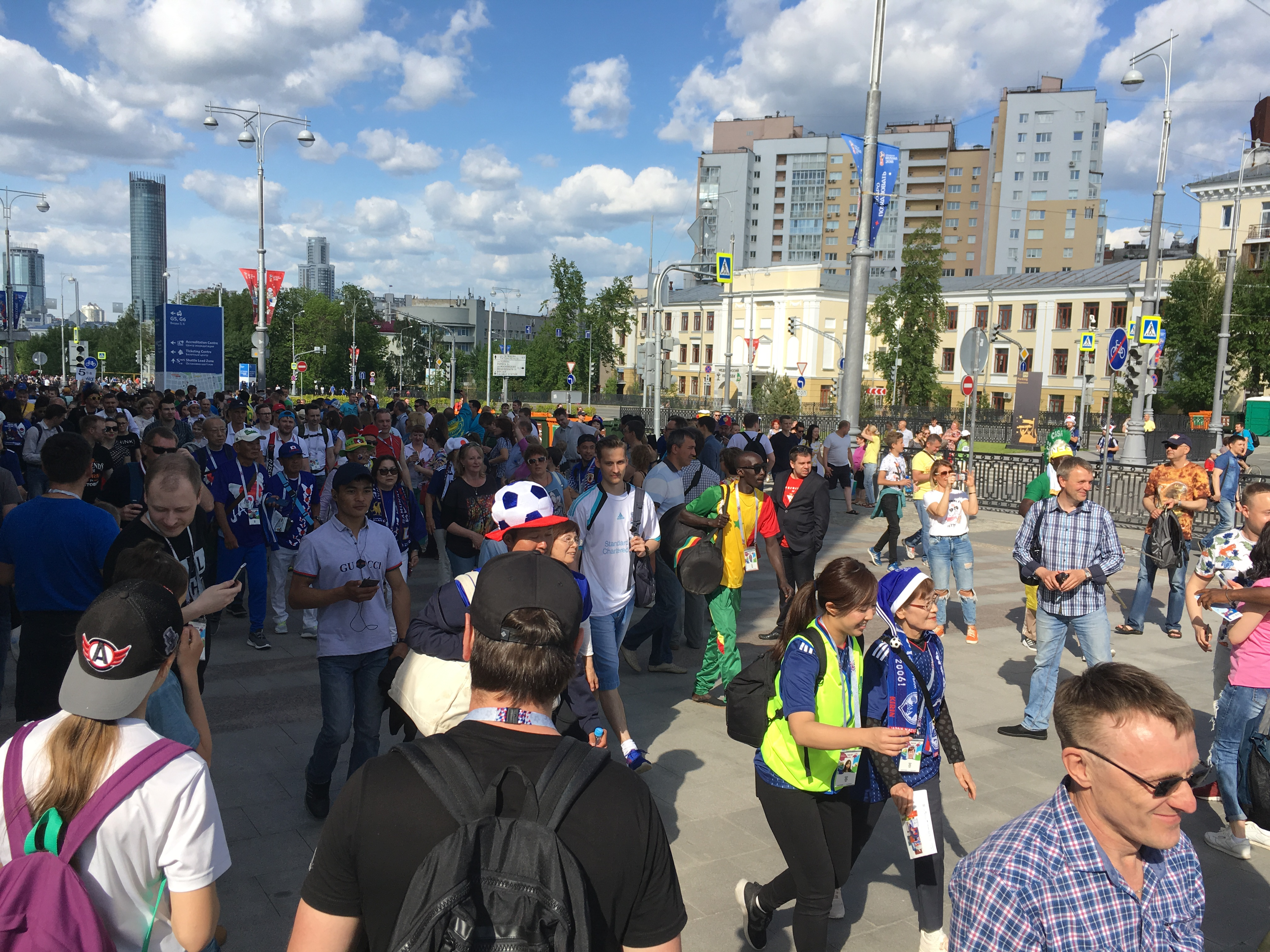
Crowd of fans in Yekaterinburg during the 2018 World Cup

Yekaterinburg hosted four matches of the 2018 FIFA World Cup Yekaterinburg is one of the 11 Russian cities that hosted the 2018 FIFA World Cup. The matches were played on the upgraded Yekaterinburg Arena.

For the World Cup 2018, from 7 October 2015 to 29 December 2017, the Central Stadium was upgraded to bring it into compliance with FIFA requirements for the World Cup and was renamed Yekaterinburg Arena. The architectural concept of the new stadium is built on a combination of historical walls and the built-in core of the modern arena. During the reconstruction of the sports facility, which is a monument of history and culture, the facades are carefully preserved, and the arena itself is equipped with the latest technical achievements of the sports industry. Temporary stands extending outside the stadium's original perimeter were erected to comply with the FIFA requirement of seating for 35,000 spectators. They can hold a total of 12,000 spectators, but the seating will be removed after the World Cup, decreasing the seating capacity back to 23,000.

The FIFA Fan Fest in Yekaterinburg was located in the Mayakovsky Central Park of Entertainment and Culture. Located just outside the city centre in a well-known amusement park, it had capacity for 17,000 people.

Koltsovo Airport was also reconstructed and had a second runway built. In addition, work was done to prepare another passenger terminal, modernize the technical infrastructure, and launch the business aviation hangar. The airport's capacity in preparation for the World Cup has increased to two thousand people per hour. The street and road network was also upgraded.

== International relations ==
=== Consulates ===
The United States, United Kingdom, Germany, France, China and several other countries have consulates in Yekaterinburg.

=== BRIC summit ===
The BRIC countries met for their first official summit on 16 June 2009, in Yekaterinburg, with Luiz Inácio Lula da Silva, Dmitry Medvedev, Manmohan Singh, and Hu Jintao, the respective leaders of Brazil, Russia, India and China, all attending. The foreign ministers of the BRIC countries had also met in Yekaterinburg previously on 16 May 2008.

=== World Expo ===
In June 2013, at the 153rd General Assembly of the Bureau of International Expositions held in Paris, representatives from Yekaterinburg presented the city's bid to host the Expo 2020. Russian president Vladimir Putin confirmed during a televised statement in English to earmark the required funds to build an exhibition complex large enough to receive the estimated 30 million visitors from more than 150 countries. Ultimately, Dubai was chosen to host the exhibition. Yekaterinburg later bid for the Expo 2025. Yekaterinburg's concept for the bid exhibition relates to the technologies to make people happy by changing the world with innovation and quality of life. The host was announced on 23 November 2018 and Yekaterinburg lost out to Osaka, Japan.

Yekaterinburg hosted the Global Summit on Manufacturing and Industrialization (GMIS — 2019) under the auspices of the United Nations. The annual INNOPROM exhibition is among the five largest industrial exhibitions in the world.

=== Twin towns – sister cities ===
Yekaterinburg is twinned with:

- Annaba, Annaba Province, Algeria
- Ferentino, Lazio, Italy (1997)
- Guangzhou, Guangdong, China (2002)
- Incheon, South Korea (2009)
- Managua, Nicaragua (2013)
- Plovdiv, Plovdiv Province, Bulgaria
- San Jose, California, United States (1992)

== Notable people ==
- Anton Bakov, Leader of the Monarchist Party
- Sweetie Fox, erotic model, porn star, and cosplayer
- Irina Antonenko, Miss Russia 2010
- Aleksei Balabanov, film director, screenwriter, producer
- Vera Bazarova, pairs figure skater
- Pavel Bazhov, folklorist and children's author
- Old Man Bukashkin, artist and poet
- Pavel Datsyuk, ice hockey player
- Nikolay Durakov, bandy legend
- Chiang Fang-liang, former first lady of Taiwan
- Aleksey Fedorchenko, film director, producer
- Denis Galimzyanov, sprinter cyclist
- Anna Gavrilenko, Group rhythmic gymnast Olympic Gold medalist
- Nikolay Karpol, national women volleyball team coach
- Nikolai Khabibulin, ice hockey player
- Alexei Yashin, ice hockey player
- Alexei Khvostenko, avant-garde poet, singer-songwriter, artist, and sculptor
- Nikolay Kolyada, actor, director, writer, playwright, and playwriting teacher
- Ilya Kormiltsev, poet, translator, publisher
- Olga Kotlyarova, Olympic runner
- Maxim Kovtun, figure skater
- Vladislav Krapivin, children's author
- Ksenia Mironova, journalist
- Valeria Savinykh, WTA Professional player
- Nikolay Krasovsky, mathematician
- Yulia Lipnitskaya, figure skater
- Iskander Makhmudov, businessman
- Vladimir Malakhov, ice hockey player
- Gennady Mesyats, vice-president of the Russian Academy of Sciences
- Maxim Miroshkin, pairs figure skater
- Vladimir Mulyavin (1941 – 2003), Belarusian musician and the founder of the folk-rock band Pesniary
- Alfia Nazmutdinova, rhythmic gymnast
- Ernst Neizvestny, sculptor
- Oleg Platonov, writer, historian, and economist
- Daria Pridannikova, rhythmic gymnast
- Eduard Rossel, ex-governor of Sverdlovsk Oblast
- Boris Ryzhy, poet
- Mikhail Shchennikov, race walker
- Vera Sessina, rhythmic gymnast
- Georgy Shishkin, painter
- Vassily Sigarev, playwright, screenwriter, film director
- Anastasiia Tatareva, Group rhythmic gymnast Olympic Gold medalist
- Sergei Tchepikov, Olympic biathlon competitor
- Vladimir Tretyakov, ex-rector of the Ural State University
- Lev Vainshtein, Olympic shooter
- Sergei Vonsovsky, physicist
- Alexander Dudoladov, writer
- Alexander Malinin, singer
- Petr Yan, Current UFC Bantamweight Champion

== See also ==
- Catherine's Cathedral

== Others ==
- A ballistic missile submarine of the Project 667BDRM Delfin class (NATO reporting name: Delta IV) is named Ekaterinburg (K-84/"807") in honour of the city.
- The asteroid 27736 Ekaterinburg was named in the city's honour on 1 June 2007.
