= Timeline of Yekaterinburg =

The following is a timeline of the history of the city of Yekaterinburg, Russia.

== Prior to 20th century ==
- 1723 - Ekaterinburg fortress built.
- 1725 - Verkhne-Isetski ironworks established.
- 1735 - Yekaterinburg Mint begins operating.
- 1758 - St. Catherine's Cathedral founded.
- 1774 - Epiphany Cathedral founded.
- 1783 - Yekaterinburg coat of arms design adopted.
- 1824 - Rastorguyev-Kharitonov Palace built.
- 1839 - Trinity Cathedral consecrated.
- 1845 - Ekaterinburg Drama Theatre founded.
- 1853 - Natural history museum opens.
- 1860 - Population: 19,830.
- 1876 - Bolshoi Zlatoust (church belltower) built.
- 1878 - Perm-Ekaterinburg railway begins operating.
- 1883 - Population: 25,133.
- 1885 - Russian Orthodox Diocese of Yekaterinburg established.
- 1895 - Trans-Siberian Railway begins operating.
- 1897 - Population: 43,052.

== 20th century ==
- 1913 - Population: 70,000.
- 1918 - 17 July: Execution of the Romanov family by Bolsheviks.
- 1919 - City becomes capital of the Yekaterinburg Governorate.
- 1920 - Ural State University founded (including Ural Industrial Institute).
- 1923 - City becomes capital of Ural Oblast.
- 1924 - City renamed "Sverdlovsk."
- 1926 - Population: 136,421.
- 1928 - Nizhne-Isetski becomes part of city.
- 1930
  - Sverdlovsk Zoo established.
  - Avangard football club formed.
  - Bolshoi Zlatoust (church belltower) demolished.
- 1932 - Uktus Airfield in operation.
- 1933 - Ural Heavy Machine Building Plant begins operating.
- 1934
  - Urals State Conservatory founded.
  - City becomes capital of the Sverdlovsk Oblast.
- 1936 - Ural Philharmonic Orchestra founded.
- 1939 - Population: 425,544.
- 1941 - Red Army Theatre relocates temporarily to Sverdlovsk.
- 1943 - Koltsovo Airport in operation.
- 1955 - Television Centre begins broadcasting.
- 1957 - Central Stadium built.
- 1965 - Population: 919,000.
- 1977 - Ipatiev House demolished.
- 1979
  - 2 April: Sverdlovsk anthrax leak.
  - Population: 1,239,000.
- 1983 - TV Tower construction begins.
- 1985 - Population: 1,300,000.
- 1991
  - City named "Yekaterinburg" again.
  - Yekaterinburg Metro begins operating.
  - Yekaterinburg Commodity Exchange founded.
- 1992 - Arkady Mikhailovich Chernetsky becomes mayor.
- 1993 - 27 September: Urals Republic declared.
- 1999 - Bishop Oleg Mironov ousted.
- 2000 - City becomes part of the Ural Federal District.

== 21st century ==
- 2003 - Church of All Saints built.
- 2006 - IKEA branch in business.
- 2009
  - 16 June: 1st BRIC summit held in city.
  - Yeltsin Presidential Center founded.
- 2010
  - Alexander Yacob becomes head of city administration.
  - February Revolution (apartment complex) built on February Revolution Street (Ekaterinburg)
  - Population: 1,349,772.
- 2011
  - Russian Orthodox Archdiocese of Yekaterinburg established.
  - Vysotsky (skyscraper) built.
- 2013
  - 15 February: Chelyabinsk meteor visible from city.
  - 28 August: Search for escaped crocodile.
  - 8 September: Yekaterinburg mayoral election, 2013 held; Yevgeny Roizman wins.
  - Population: 1,424,702.

== See also ==
- Yekaterinburg history
- History of Yekaterinburg
- List of mayors of Yekaterinburg
- List of administrative-territorial units headquartered in Yekaterinburg (in Russian)
- List of landmarks in Yekaterinburg

== Bibliography ==
- Georg Adolf Erman (1848). "(Yekaterinburg)". Travels in Siberia. Longman, Brown, Green, and Longmans. "Translated from the German by William Desborough Cooley"
- W.G. Blackie, ed. (1875). "Ekaterinburg". Imperial Gazetteer. London: Blackie & Son.
- "Ekaterinburg". Guide to the Great Siberian Railway. St. Petersburg: Ministry of Ways of Communication. 1900.
- "Ekaterinburg" . Encyclopædia Britannica. Vol. 9 (11th ed.). 1910. pp. 138–139.
- "Yekaterinburg", Russia, Leipzig: Karl Baedeker, 1914, OCLC 1328163
