= Yekaterinburg Mint =

State mint in the Urals, Russia, 1725–1876

- Екатеринбургский монетный двор
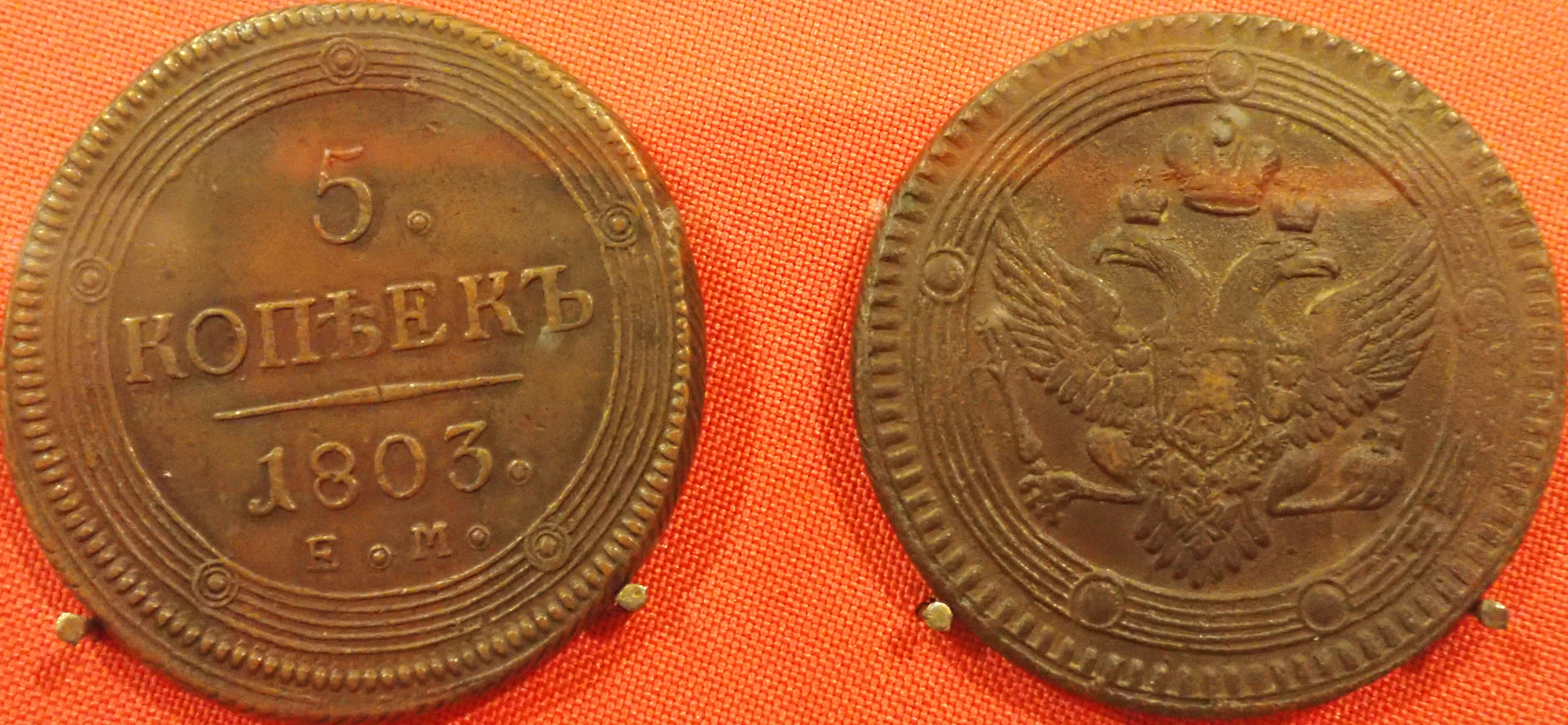
- 5 kopecks, 1803 (the letters “E. M.” on the obverse stand for “Yekaterinburg coin”)
- Interactive map of the Yekaterinburg Mint area
- Former names: Georg Wilhelm de Gennin

General information
- Location: Yekaterinburg, Russian Empire
- Opened: 1725
- Closed: 1876
- Owner: State-owned (Russian Empire)

Yekaterinburg Mint was a state-owned enterprise mint that made copper coins that operated in Yekaterinburg from 1725 to 1876. It was on the site of what is now Historical Square, on both banks of the Iset River.

The mint was established in the Urals with the approval of Peter I, on the initiative of Georg Wilhelm de Gennin and Vasily Tatishchev, who had studied European experience of local coinage and sought to create a local source of money to support the development of the metallurgical industry. The mint operated intermittently from 1725 to 1876 and, by the end of the 18th century, was the main national producer of copper money. In the 1790s, the Yekaterinburg mint produced about 90% of all Russian coinage, and in the early 19th century, after the closure of the Yekaterinburg Ironworks, the mint became — and remained until its closure — the city's principal industrial enterprise. Depending on the required volume of production, the mint's staff numbers varied over time, ranging at different periods from 400 to more than 2,000 people.

In the 18th century, Yekaterinburg struck copper plate money and blanks to supply the Moscow mints; since 1736, following a decree by Anna Ioannovna, it struck national Russian coinage at a rate of 10 rubles per pood. Later, on the basis of several imperial decrees, coins withdrawn from circulation were reminted. In the 19th century, the mint mainly struck small-denomination change coins. In addition to coins, at various times the enterprise also produced copper tableware, tags for marking materials received from ascribed peasants, medals, pectoral crosses, seals for local government bodies, buttons, plaques, and percussion caps for artillery shells. Historians consider the total value of coins struck by the Yekaterinburg Mint over its entire existence at 150 million rubles. After coinage ceased in Yekaterinburg in 1876, part of the equipment was transferred to state-owned Ural factories, the coin dies were destroyed under the supervision of the Mining Department, and the factory buildings were handed over to the railway workshops of the Ural Mining Railway.

From the late 18th century (Note: Sources give different dates for the appearance of the letters Е. М. on Yekaterinburg coins: some researchers cite a decree of 1796, others a decree of 1763.) coins struck in Yekaterinburg bore the letters Е. М. ("Yekaterinburg coin") on either the obverse or reverse.

In 1974, the surviving mint buildings were placed under protection as a federally significant object of Russia's cultural heritage.

== Background ==
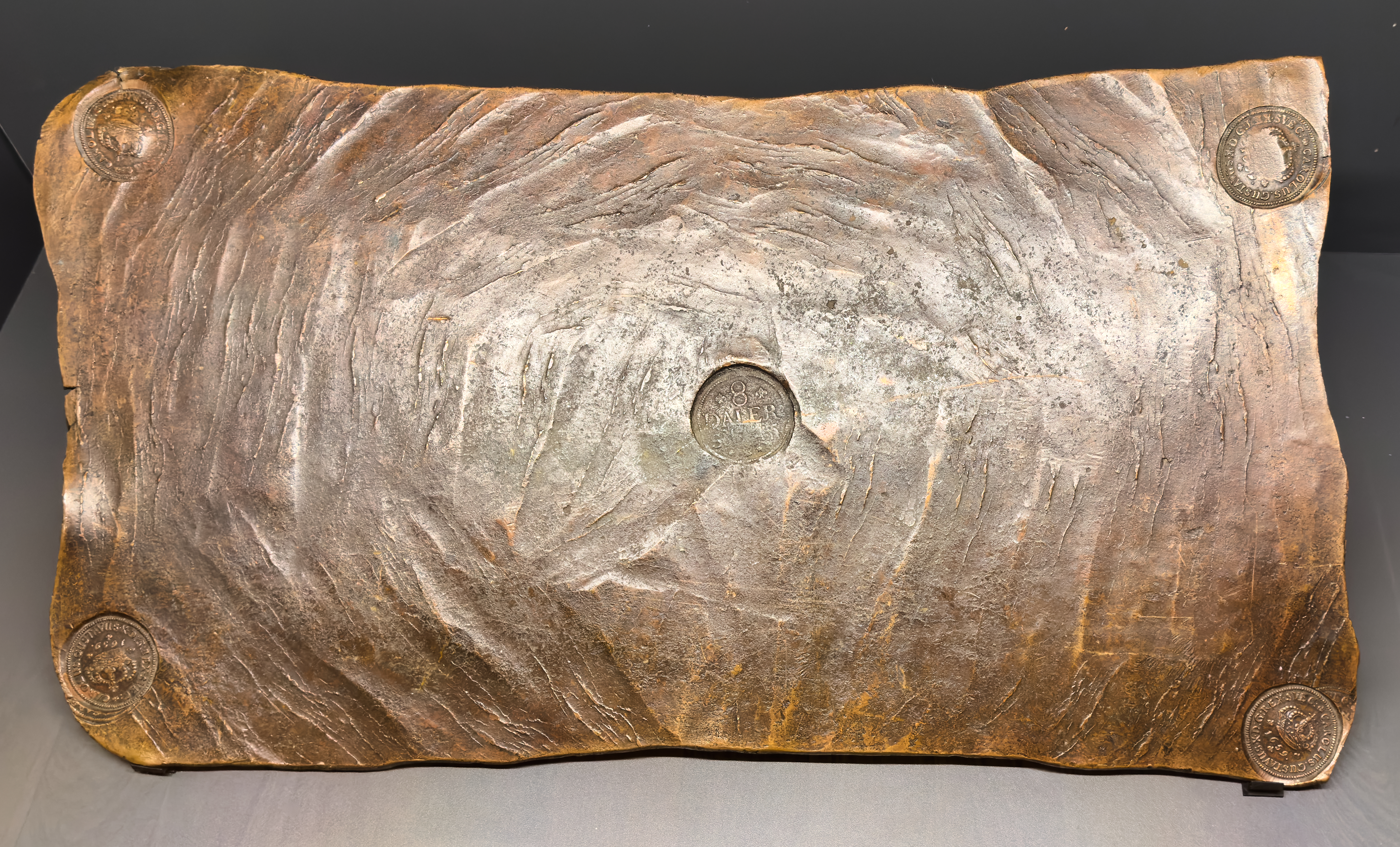
A Swedish 8-thalercopper plate, 17th century (National Museum of the Republic of Tatarstan)

Several factors contributed to establish the mint in Yekaterinburg in the early 18th century. The intensive construction of state-owned mining works in the Urals required constant and substantial funding, which the authorities did not always provide promptly or in sufficient volume. Russia's copper-production technology at the time was almost identical to the European's, and pure copper was suitable for striking coins. The first copper-smelting works in the Urals appeared during this period — the Yegoshikha and Pyskor works, and later the Polevskoy fabrics. Historians also cite numerous problems with coin circulation nationwide, such as the use of money made from different metals and a large number of counterfeits, as other reasons for organising minting outside the country's central regions.

The Swedish model was taken as an example: there, during periods of economic decline, state-owned mines were permitted to strike heraldic copper plates (Note: From German, meaning "plate, slab".) — rectangular slabs whose face value corresponded to the real value of the copper. These plates were put into circulation in the same place where they were produced.

== History ==
=== Plate Yard of the Yekaterinburg Fabric (1725–1735) ===
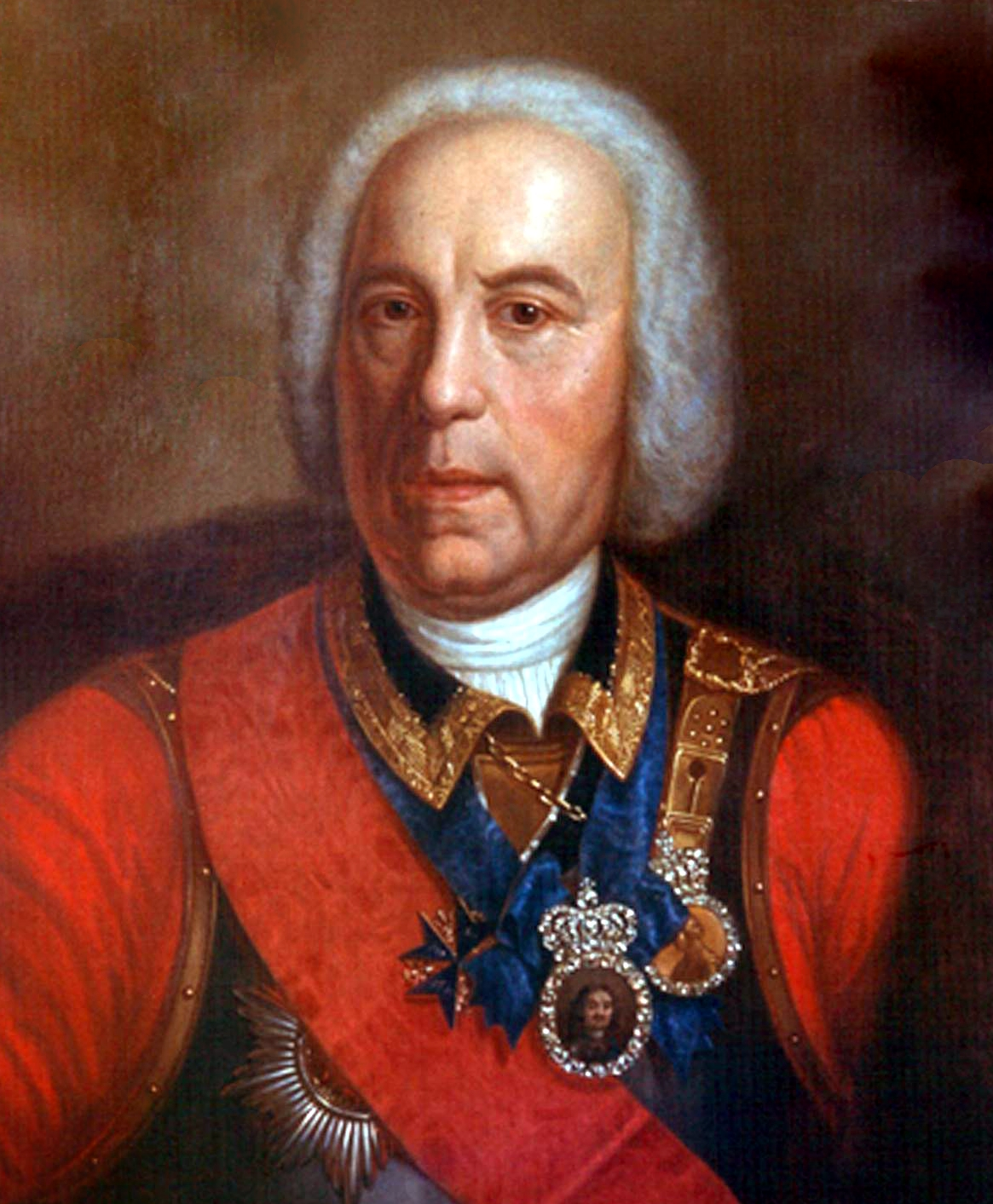
Georg Wilhelm de Gennin

At the end of 1722, the German-born engineer, holding the rank of major general, Georg Wilhelm de Gennin was appointed by Peter I as head of the Ural Mining Administration. In December of that year, he notified the Berg Collegium of the resumption of construction of the works on the Iset River and the fortress beside it, which had been begun by his predecessor Vasily Tatishchev. On 8 June 1723, de Gennin sent a tray made from the first smelting of copper, along with his personal adjutant, as a gift to Catherine I, asking that the new works be named in the empress's honor. By April 1724, de Gennin reported to Peter I by letter that 1,500 poods of copper had been smelted at the Yekaterinburg and Uktus (Note: Copper smelting there had begun in 1713 with a single hearth, and from 1716 with two hearths.) works.

De Gennin's goal was to obtain state permission to strike coins in the Urals amid a shortage of state funding. The Senate had allocated 130,000 rubles for the construction of the Ural works, and by 1725 building the still-unfinished Yekaterinburg works and fortress had cost 150,000. De Gennin set off for St. Petersburg at the end of January 1725 in the hope of receiving new funds from the treasury, but he learned of Peter I's death while still en route.

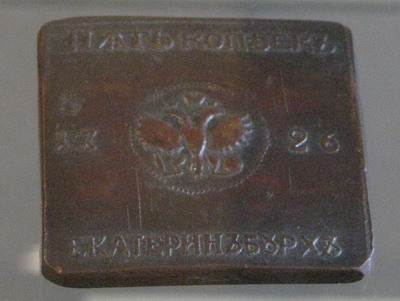
A 5-kopeck plate from 1726

In December 1724, to gain familiarity with the economic and political situation in Sweden, which had been defeated in the Great Northern War, Peter I sent Vasily Tatishchev abroad, where he remained until April 1726. In his reports home he described the local monetary system and heavy copper coins — plates. Following Peter I's death, on the basis of Tatishchev's and de Gennin's reports, a Senate decree was issued on 14 June 1725 and confirmed by Catherine I, ordering that "at the Siberian state-owned works, plates be made from pure red copper, stamped in the center with the value and, at each corner, the coat of arms; namely, ruble, half-ruble, quarter-ruble and ten-kopeck denominations; but that these plates be produced at a weight of 10 rubles per pood, without deducting the cost of labor and other expenses from that weight, and that these plates circulate among the people for all manner of goods, and in taxes, and into and out of the treasury". (Note: Excerpts from archival documents on the mint's history are given in the book by Zlokazov and Semyonov.) This decree ended state funding for the construction of new works, significantly limiting the freedom of action of de Gennin, who had again been appointed head of the Ural Mining Administration.

In the center of each plate was stamped its denomination, the word Екатеринбурхъ, and the year of issue. The corner dies depicted a double-headed eagle bearing a shield with Catherine I's monogram. In 1726 the Berg Collegium approved placing the coat of arms of Moscow — a horseman with a spear — on the heraldic dies instead.

On 6 October 1725, de Gennin arrived at the Yеgoshikha works with a team of seven Moscow master coiners. On 9 October 1725, de Gennin issued instructions to Bergeschworen Konstantin Artemyevich Gordeyev, directing that: the workshop where the plates were to be stamped should be located in the shed where the trip-hammers on the far bank were housed; the blanks for the copper plates were to be beaten out there; the presses for cutting the plates were to be cast by master Deyman (Deichman); master Ivan Konstantinov, responsible for engraving the dies, was to immediately engrave dies to the sample provided, forging the dies from the most suitable steel; the hammer used to strike the plates was to be cast only after first determining the right weight, so that the design could be struck in a single blow — if it proved too light, a heavier one should be cast; and a tool should be devised to mark the edges of the plates so that no one could clip them. De Gennin's instructions to the craftsmen departed in many respects from the Berg Collegium's direct instructions to follow Swedish technology exactly. For example, de Gennin tried to speed up the pood-weight copper ingots forging by casting them into longer, thinner molds, greased the plate-cutting shears with vegetable oil, and coated the dies with wax. The finished plates were fired in furnaces and then soaked for a day in the sediment left over from brewing kvass, saving on coloring in this way.

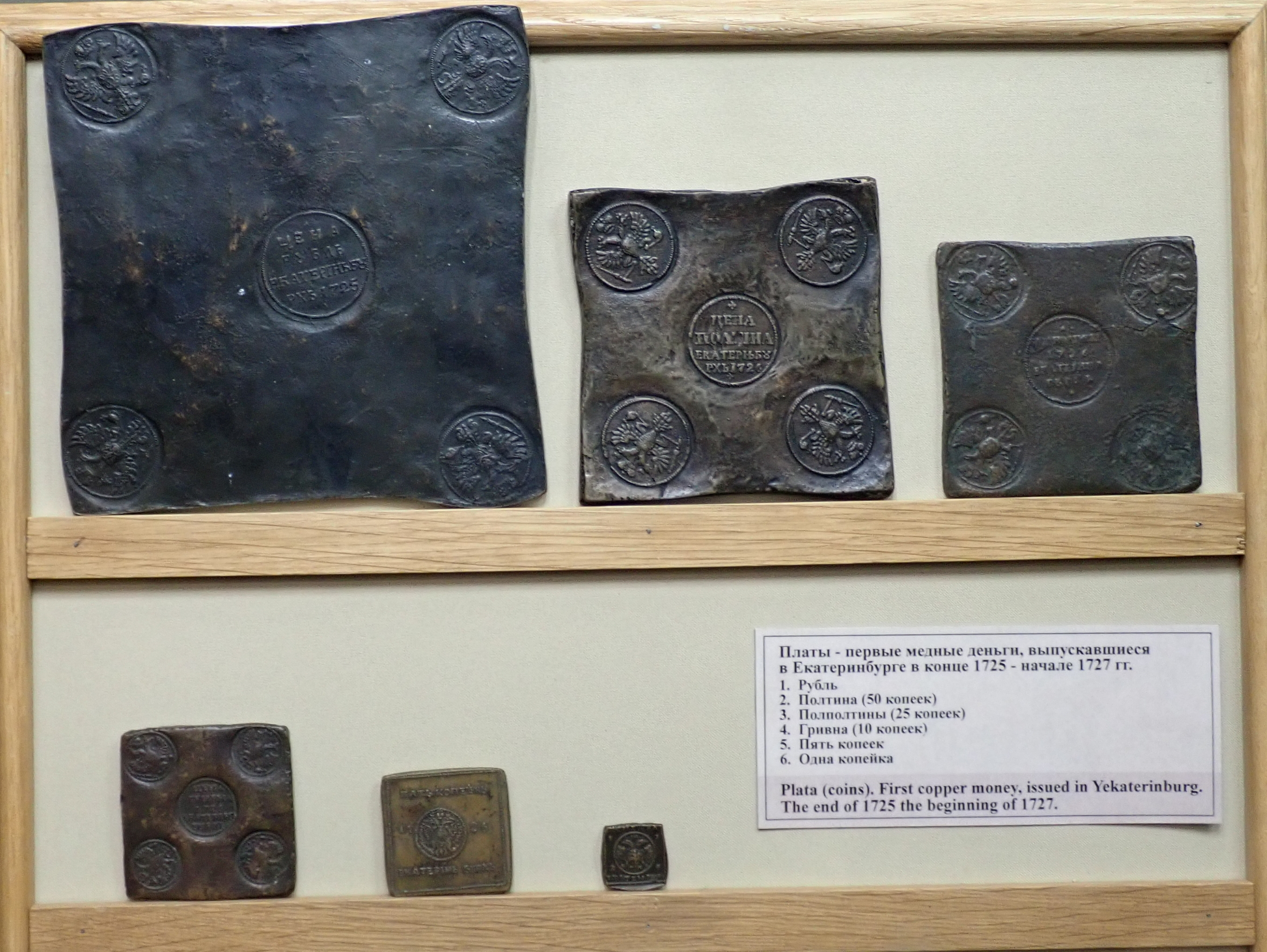
Copper plates struck in Yekaterinburg

On 1 December 1725 (Note: According to other sources, striking of the plates began on 18 October 1725, or in February 1726.) at the Yekaterinburg works, the newly formed Plate Yard began striking square copper "plates" with face values of 1 ruble, 50, 25 and 10 kopecks, at a rate of 10 rubles per pood (i.e., 10 rubles obtained from one pood of copper). The Plate Yard was located on the site now occupied by the Yekaterinburg Museum of Fine Arts (later a military barracks stood there, then a factory hospital, and later still an almshouse). In March 1726, the Yekaterinburg plates entered circulation; on 10 March de Gennin sent the empress samples of five- and one-kopeck plates, requesting permission to strike small-denomination coins. On 28 April 1726, Catherine I issued a decree permitting the manufacture of one pood of five-kopeck plates and two poods of one-kopeck plates, and by a decree of 14 April 1726, she formally introduced the large-denomination Yekaterinburg plates into full monetary circulation, with a design modified from de Gennin's original proposal.

In 1726, the works issued copper plates worth a total of 38,771 rubles 26 kopecks, weighing 3,877 poods. However, during his trip to Europe, Tatishchev discovered that Dutch merchants had taken to hoarding Swedish plates and exporting them for metallurgical purposes. Whereas the export of ordinary copper ingots was subject to duties, plates counted as money rather than simply metal, and so could be exported to Holland freely in any quantity. This drove down the value of copper and made the expense of striking the plates themselves pointless. He conveyed his concerns to members of the Supreme Privy Council, which concluded that de Gennin's initiatives were aimed at securing full autonomy from the Senate. As a result, Catherine I ordered by a personal decree of 30 December 1726 to stop the production of plates in Yekaterinburg.

In addition, the square copper coins were heavy (a 1-ruble coin weighed 1/10 of a pood — 1 kg 638 g) and inconvenient to use; the public accepted them reluctantly, and counterfeiters reminted them into round coins. In 1726, master coiners also reported to de Gennin that it was impossible to produce coins at an exactly fixed weight, since the available conditions and tools did not allow for it. By a decree of Catherine I of 26 January 1727, plate production at the Yekaterinburg works was halted; the works first switched to producing copper blanks for the Moscow mints, and then to producing copper tableware and bells, which it continued to do until the end of 1734, despite numerous appeals and letters from de Gennin to the Senate, to Peter II, and then to Anna Ioannovna.

The copper plates were withdrawn from circulation and exchanged for silver. As a result, more than 1,300 poods of copper, worth over 13,000 rubles, were returned to the treasury within six months. In total, over 1726–1727, plates were issued to a total value of 38,770 rubles, including 1,687 one-ruble pieces, 2,209 fifty-kopeck pieces, 15,017 twenty-five-kopeck pieces, 321,811 ten-kopeck pieces, 651 five-kopeck pieces, and 1,096 one-kopeck pieces.

=== Copper Blanks Office → Monetary Affairs Office → Mint (1736–1762) ===
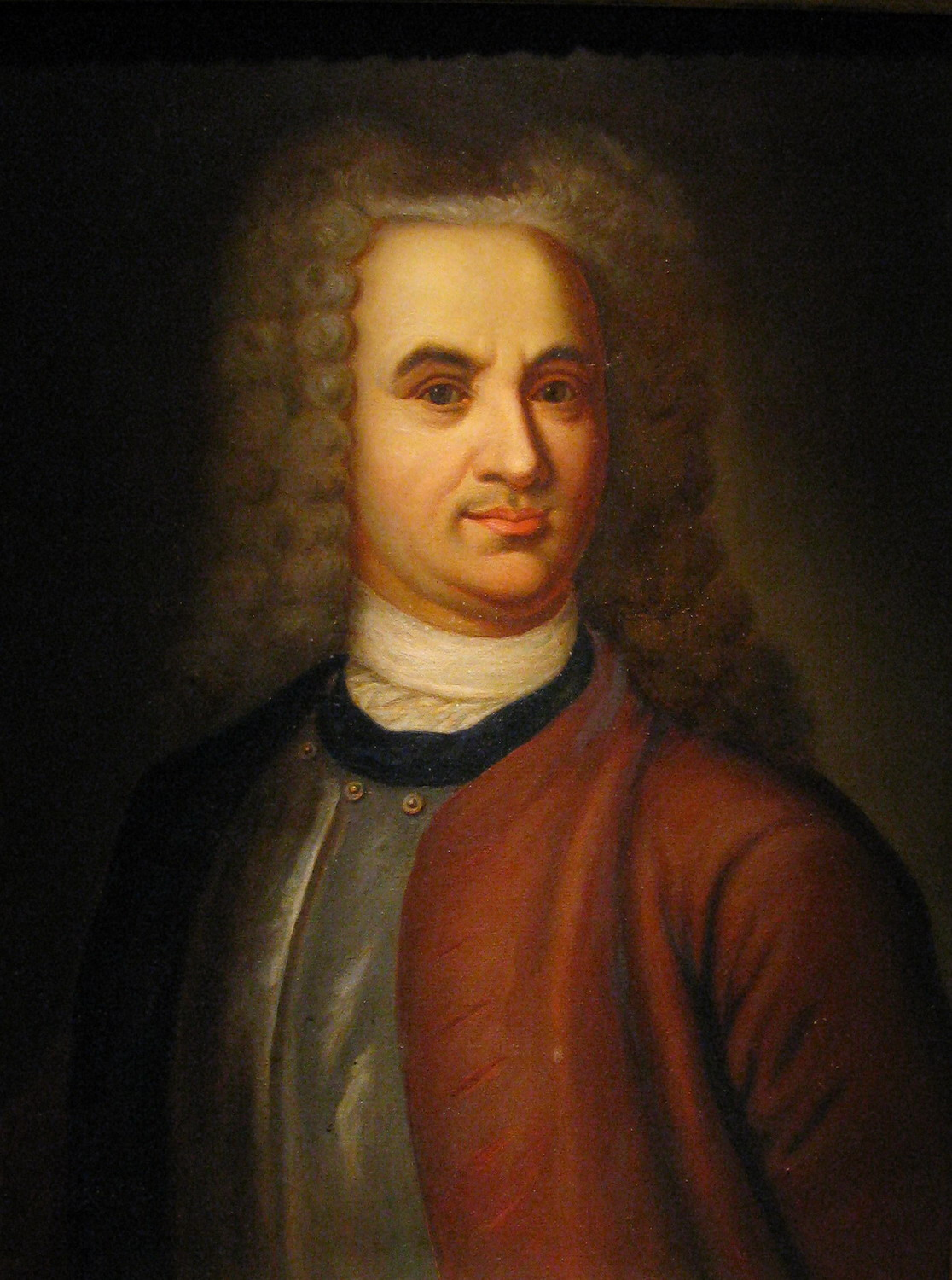
Vasily Tatishchev

In January 1727, Tatishchev was appointed a member of the Moscow Mint Office and was tasked with establishing stable production of five-kopeck coins at the Moscow mints, which were supplied with semi-finished blanks from Yekaterinburg. By summer, the workshops had been rebuilt and fitted with new machinery, substantially increasing output. After Anna Ioannovna's accession to the throne, Tatishchev was appointed chairman of the Mint Office in early 1730. On 10 February 1734, the empress appointed Tatishchev chief administrator of the Ural, Siberian, and Kazan mining works, removing de Gennin from that post. Having returned once more to the Urals, Tatishchev immediately requested permission to resume minting in Yekaterinburg, but was refused. A decree of 12 December 1734 instructed him to resume only the production of copper blanks; even this required dismantling the smelting shop at the works, halting the sheet-metal and tableware workshops, and bringing in craftsmen from Moscow. Production was only re-established by September of that year. The 1734 decree contained a clear hint that coin production might resume in Yekaterinburg — among other things, it ordered that quality dies be produced.

The Cabinet of Her Imperial Majesty soon agreed to Tatishchev's proposal to resume minting in Yekaterinburg, and on 16 December 1735 issued the corresponding decree. In January 1736, Tatishchev organized the Office of Copper Blanks, headed by Councillor Andrei Fyodorovich Khrushchev of the St. Petersburg Admiralty Office, with production overseen by mining inspector Yakov Stepnov. On 12 April 1736, ten coin-making craftsmen and their families (two die engravers, three rolling-mill masters, three blank-cutters, and two coin-strikers) were sent from Moscow to help set up the minting operation, along with 250 recruits for auxiliary work. The Office of Copper Blanks produced copper coin blanks for dengas (half-kopecks) and polushkas (quarter-kopecks), which were sent to the Moscow Mint. The blanks were struck from ingot copper, then had their edges marked and were embossed.

Coin striking began in Yekaterinburg on 17 June 1736. On 8 July 1736, the Office of Copper Blanks was renamed the Yekaterinburg Office of Monetary Affairs, within the Main Administration of the Ural mining works. (Note: The official name was "Yekaterinburg Monetary Affairs Office of the Main Administration of the Works".) Khrushchev remained in charge of the office, with Stepnov overseeing production. By 17 January 1737, 24 coining presses were operating at full capacity. This period is considered to mark the establishment of the Mint in Yekaterinburg proper, which by then comprised workshops for die-making, blank annealing, edge-marking and striking, as well as a counting house and several storehouses. The site was surrounded by a wooden fence with metal spikes on top and folding gates, and a guard post stood beside them. In March 1740, Khrushchev's nephew Alexei Mikhailovich took over the office.

Because of governmental changes and the Berg Collegium abolition, minting of Yekaterinburg coinage was suspended in May 1741 by Senate decree. Despite this, the office and the mint continued to exist, and equipment was modernized. After Elizabeth Petrovna came to the throne, Yekaterinburg was visited by Anton Fyodorovich Tomilov, appointed president of the reconstituted Berg Collegium, who came out in favor of resuming minting in the Urals following his trip. In March 1747, a Senate decree was signed to resume coin production in Yekaterinburg; in August of that year additional presses and equipment were brought to Yekaterinburg, along with craftsmen. Production resumed in January 1748. By Senate order, the mint was removed from the Main Administration's authority, and production was overseen by Leonty Dmitriyevich Ugrimov, sent from Moscow, who died in January 1750. After Ugrimov's death, the office was again placed under the Main Administration. By this time, output had reached 150 poods of copper per day, equivalent to more than a million rubles a year.

On 28 July 1751, coin striking was again suspended, and for the following three years only the stamping of coin blanks continued. The craftsmen who had been brought in, along with some of the equipment, returned to Moscow.

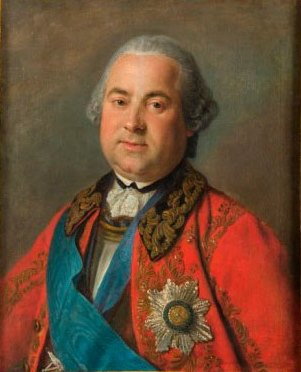
Pyotr Shuvalov

At the end of 1754, the Senate approved a proposal from the Mint Chancellery to begin mass production of one-kopeck coins, and to withdraw and remint the old five-kopeck coins that had been redenominated to one kopeck in 1746. On 7 March 1755, this decision was confirmed by Elizabeth Petrovna, with the planned volume increased from the proposed one million rubles to 3.5 million. By a personal decree of 18 August 1755, the Yekaterinburg mint was tasked with striking 2 million of that total. Die engravers and coin-making craftsmen again arrived from Moscow. Round-the-clock, seven-day-a-week reminting of coins into denominations of 5, 2, and 1 kopeck began, at double the previous monetary rate, with the Elizabethan coins reminted on the Prussian model at a rate of 32 rubles per pood of copper instead of the previous 16 rubles. In October 1756, on the initiative of Count Pyotr Shuvalov, a special Senate commission was established to oversee the reminting, led by Ilya Vasilyevich Sokolnikov, and in November of that year oversight was transferred to the new head of the Ural Mining Administration, Nikifor Gerasimovich Kleopin. In March 1758, the Senate raised the overall coin-production target to 5,082,806 rubles, of which 2,582,806 rubles was allocated to Yekaterinburg.

On 19 September 1759, a fire destroyed part of the buildings and equipment of the Yekaterinburg works and of the mint located on the right bank of the Iset River beyond the dam. The main part of the mint, located on the left bank, was undamaged. The surviving equipment was reorganized to restore production. In the summer of 1760, construction began on a new stone rolling shop. From this point on, the mint concentrated on the more profitable striking of five-kopeck coins and the reminting of kopecks into groschen-style coins. During this period, the Office of Monetary Affairs was headed by Kleopin's son, Grigory. In the 1760s, part of the Yekaterinburg mint's workforce and equipment was transferred to the Suzun Mint, then under construction.

Overall, the development of the copper-smelting industry and of minting in the second half of the 18th century was aided by the high profitability of copper production at privately owned works. For example, the maximum cost of one pood of copper delivered to Yekaterinburg was 2 rubles 25 kopecks, while the mint, using treasury funds, purchased a pood for 5 rubles 50 kopecks.

=== Yekaterinburg Mint (1763–1876) ===
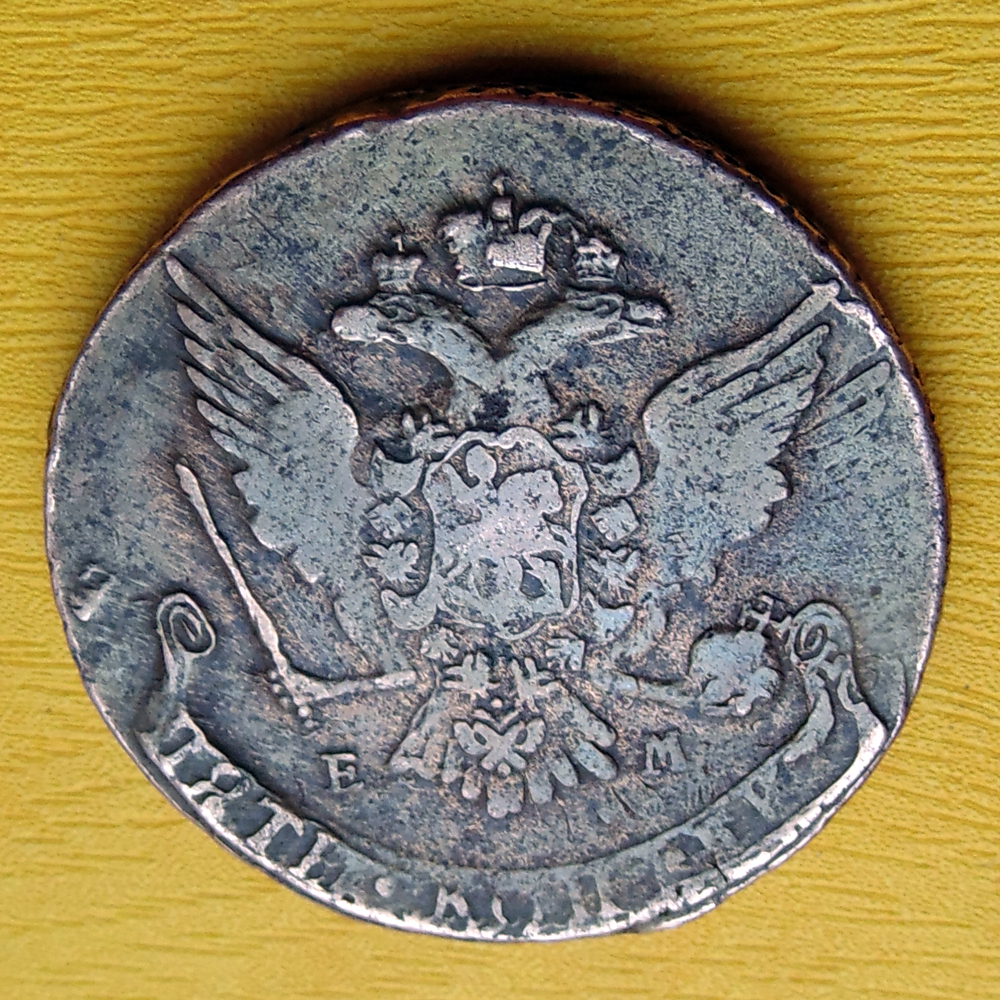
A copper five-kopeck coin bearing the coat of arms of the Russian Empire, 1765

In May 1763, the administration of coin production was transferred from the Mining Administration to the newly established Yekaterinburg Mint Expedition. This was formed from Shuvalov's commission and was accountable to the Chief Mint Expedition in St. Petersburg. Sokolnikov remained head of the Yekaterinburg Mint Expedition. This led to a series of conflicts between the leadership of the Ural Mining Department and the Mint Expedition. On 28 October 1763, the Senate adopted a decree "On the Construction of a Works in Yekaterinburg for Making Copper Coinage". From this time on, coins struck in Yekaterinburg bore the marking "Е. М.," meaning "Yekaterinburg coin".

In 1766–1768, the mint's workshops were rebuilt in stone at the expense of the Mining Department's budget. This marked the beginning of the decline of the Yekaterinburg metallurgical works, which had effectively been carrying out orders for the mint, itself now the key enterprise in Yekaterinburg. In 1769, by Catherine II's decree, reconstruction of the Yekaterinburg works began, with clear priority given to minting. The workshops of the newly organized lapidary works were an exception. Reconstruction was completed by the early 1780s.

In the early 1780s, Ivan Safkov was appointed head of the Yekaterinburg Mint Expedition. During this period, five workshops operated as part of the mint: a smelting shop, a rolling shop, a cutting shop, an edge-marking shop, and an embossing shop. Most of the copper was supplied by the smelting works of the Bogoslovsky Mining District: the Bogoslovsky, Petropavlovsky, and Nikolaye-Pavdinsky works. In February 1788, to expand copper coin production, the Senate decided to build two more mints in the Urals, one of which was planned near Yekaterinburg. In 1789, a site was chosen for a dam and mint further downstream on the Iset River. Construction was completed by 1795, but a fire that destroyed all the buildings prevented coining from ever beginning there. The dam and pond that survived the fire were later used to build the Nizhneisetsky works.

Charcoal, firewood, and other raw materials to supply the mint were gathered by ascribed peasants in the Mint Forest Tract (now the settlement of Monetny), located 30–35 versts from Yekaterinburg. To supply the tool steel used for making dies, the Pyshma Steel Works was built in 1786 on the Pyshma River, 22 versts from Yekaterinburg, under the direction of Ivan Filippovich German. In 1792, the factory burned down, and steel production continued at the Nizhneisetsky works from September 1798, but was halted in 1801–1802. From 1808, steel began to be produced by the mint's own resources following its merger with the Yekaterinburg works.

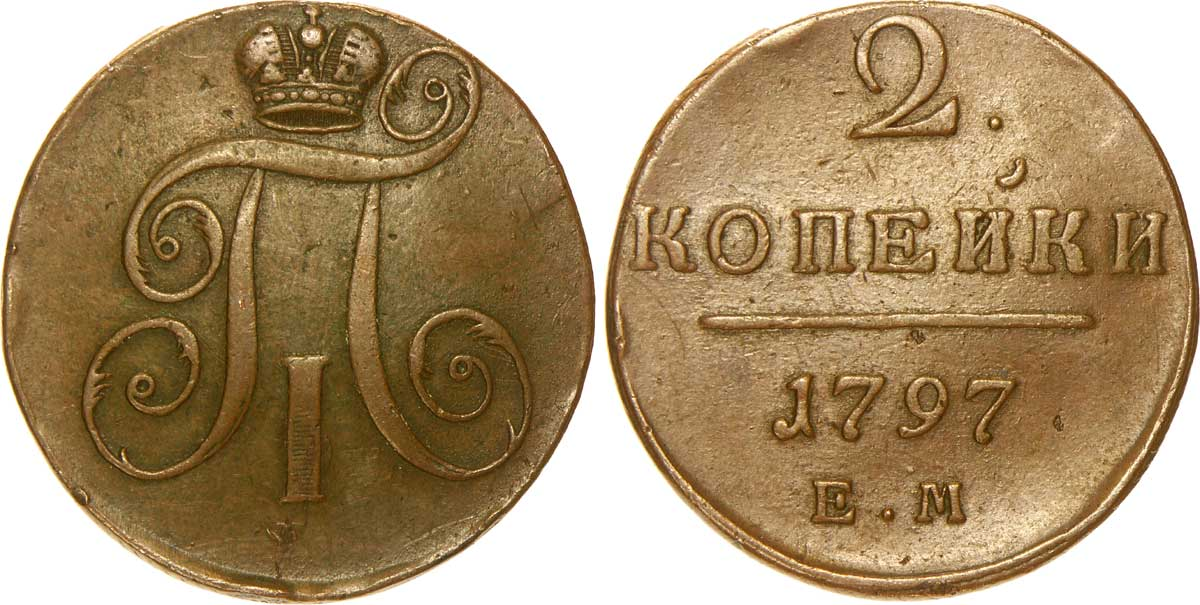
A 2-kopeck coin from 1797 bearing the monogram of Paul I

In 1796, under a secret decree, the Yekaterinburg mint took part in reminting coins back from the 16-ruble rate to the 32-ruble rate, and then in January 1797 — now by decree of Paul I — reminted them back again. (Note: In the literature, the mass reminting of coins during the reign of Paul I is known as the "Pavlovian recoinage".) Overall, by the end of the 18th century the Yekaterinburg mint was operating steadily under the new head of the Ural Mining Administration, Anikita Sergeyevich Yartsov. Total output of kopeck-denomination coins for 1797–1799 exceeded 170 million coins. On a national scale, the Yekaterinburg mint became the country's leading coin producer — in the 1790s it struck about 90% of all Russian coinage.

As a result of the 1807 reforms, the Ural Mining Administration relocated to Perm, the Yekaterinburg works officially ceased operating, and Yekaterinburg became the administrative center of the mining district of the same name. During this period, the head of the Main Office of the Yekaterinburg Works was I. F. German, who rarely left St. Petersburg. The Yekaterinburg Mint Expedition was also replaced by the Yekaterinburg Mint Office, headed by N. I. Mundt and subordinate to the Mining Department. In the course of Alexander I's administrative reforms, the silver ruble became the principal monetary unit, and the mint switched to a 24-ruble rate, striking only small-denomination change coins of two, one, and ½ kopecks, overcoming the technical difficulty of producing coins without reeded edges but with a thickened rim instead.

Initials of the mint's Münzmeisters
Initials	Mint Master	Years of Minting
Н. М.	Nikolai Ivanovich Mundt	1810–1811
И. Ф.	Ivan Felkner	1811–1812
Н. М.	Nikolai Ivanovich Mundt	1812–1821
Ф. Г.	Frans German	1818–1823
П. Г.	Pyotr Grammatchikov (Gramotchikov)	1823–1825
И. Ш.	Ivan Shevkunov	1825
И. К.	Ivan Kolobov	1825–1830
Ф. Х.	Fyodor Khvoshchinsky	1830–1837
К. Т.	Christopher (Konstantin) Thomson	1837
Н. А.	Nikolai Alekseyev	1837–1839

From 1810, it became mandatory for Russian coins to bear the initials of the mint's mint master. In 1810–1811, Yekaterinburg coins were stamped with the letters Н. М. — the initials of mint master Nikolai Ivanovich Mundt; in 1811–1812, with the letters И. Ф. — the initials of mint master Ivan Felkner; and in 1812–1821, again with Mundt's initials.

In the autumn of 1811, Andrei Fyodorovich Deryabin, director of the Mining Department, instructed German to send 2.5 million rubles in coin with the 1812 iron caravan, without naming the reason for such a large order, which was in fact prompted by the coming war. Through the joint efforts of the Mining Department, the number of furnaces and presses was increased and additional staff were taken on, bringing the mint's total workforce to 1,000 people, who worked without days off. As a result, on 21 June 1812, coins worth 2.35 million rubles were sent to St. Petersburg. After the Patriotic War of 1812, an even larger order arrived from the Mining Department for the shipment of coins worth 2.7 million rubles in 1813.

In 1813–1817, the worst drought in a hundred years affected the operation of all the Urals' water-powered works, lowering water levels in the factory ponds to a critical point and reducing production volumes. By 1817, coin output had fallen to a third of its 1812 level. Historians refer to the following decade as a period of stagnation for the mint. During this time no equipment was updated, though experiments were carried out to improve copper-smelting and coin-production technology. It had become clear that the existing technology of semi-manual coin production on water-powered presses had run its course. The main problem was the impossibility of automatic "collar" striking on the outdated presses, where manually placing the blank meant every coin came out slightly different.

A further administrative reform in 1826 led, in 1830, to the renaming of the Yekaterinburg Mint Office as the Office of the Yekaterinburg Mint. The department was headed by Fyodor Alexandrovich Khvoshchinsky. A committee for the Yekaterinburg mint reconstruction was established under the Mining Department. In February 1830, a 250-pood press of Boulton's design was brought to Yekaterinburg from St. Petersburg; at the same time, a group of Yekaterinburg coiners led by mine surveyor Khvoshchinsky, the mint's future manager, was sent to St. Petersburg to learn collar-striking. The Boulton press was installed and tested on 20 May of that year: its output proved seven times higher than that of the old presses, with five times fewer defective coins. The Boulton press had a pneumatic drive and was bulky, occupying two standard floors, which required an expansion of the factory buildings. In the end, local mechanic Nikita Morozov proposed a modification to the old presses that would allow collar-striking. In May 1830, a decision was made to begin striking new coins at a 36-ruble rate, but sample coins and dies were not obtained until January 1831. In the end, collar-striking was abandoned, and 330,000 rubles in 5- and 10-kopeck coins were sent with the spring caravan, of which 3,700 rubles' worth were rejected on inspection.

After these experiments with the new presses, it became clear to everyone that the mint's production buildings needed to be rebuilt. In 1831, Mikhail Pavlovich Malakhov, architect of the Mining Administration, drew up a design and estimate for building two new stone buildings and a new stone-faced retaining wall for the dam. In 1832, 13,000 of the required 50,400 rubles were allocated from the treasury for this work. By 1836, part of the dam's retaining wall and two adjoining wings had been built, and a second story had been added to the former arsenal building. After Vladimir Andreyevich Glinka was appointed chief administrator of the Ural mountain-range mining works in 1837, he immediately became involved in discussions of the mint's reconstruction plan. In March 1839, a design and estimate were submitted by Malakhov and Pyotr Eduardovich Tet, mechanic of the Mining Administration. In April 1839, Glinka presented the design to Yevgraf Petrovich Kovalevsky, director of the Mining Department, and in June of that year to Yegor Frantsevich Kankrin, the Minister of Finance, who finally approved the design and a budget of 122,597 rubles (excluding the cost of equipment) on 6 November 1841.

With Kankrin's assistance, three new embossing presses of Diederich Uhlhorn's design, capable of running from either a water wheel or a steam engine, were brought to Yekaterinburg. The main feature of Uhlhorn's presses was the automatic feeding of the blank under the die and removal of the struck coin, which made them far safer than the manual presses, which often caused fingers or hands to be severed when blanks were loaded and unloaded. At the same time, Uhlhorn's press demanded higher-quality copper blanks, requiring an additional calibration step for the blanks before feeding them into the press. The presses were installed by 1842, by which time the main construction work on the new building on the right bank of the Iset had also been completed. Installation of the equipment was fully complete by the autumn of 1844, including six Boulton-system presses and six Uhlhorn presses.

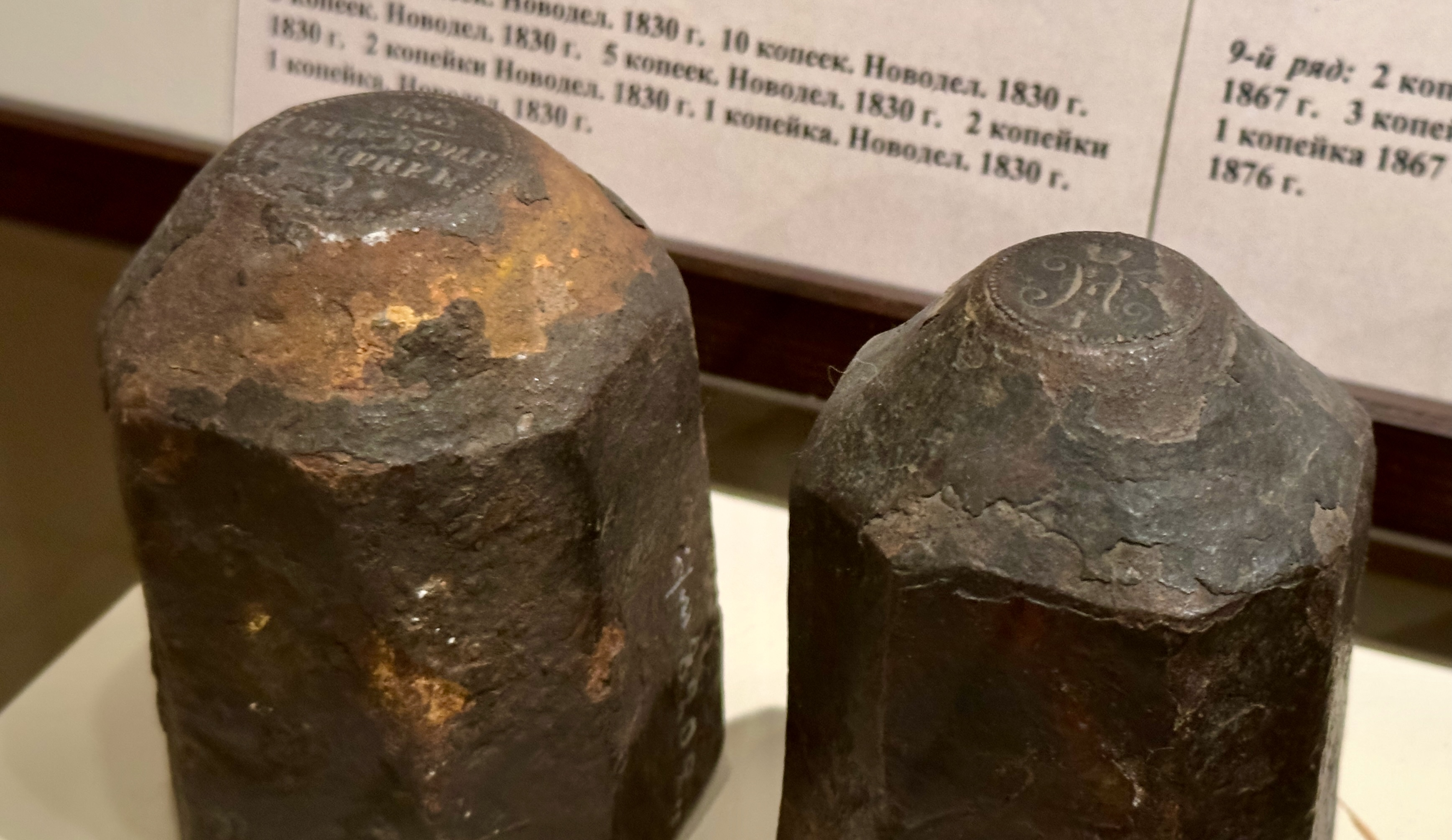
Coin dies (19th century)

In October 1844, Fyodor Fyodorovich Beger, newly appointed director of the Mining Department, informed Glinka of plans to cut copper coin production, as the monetary system had begun shifting to paper banknotes. At the same time, coins at the 36-ruble rate were being withdrawn from circulation. Since 1845, some of the mint's workshops had to be shut down and workers laid off. The office was also disbanded, and administration of minting was transferred to the Yekaterinburg mining district. As a result, a shortage of coin in circulation in Perm Governorate made it necessary to resume coining in Yekaterinburg. By a personal decree of 7 February 1849, the mint again received an order to strike coins at a 32-ruble rate, but owing to the perennial shortage of equipment and craftsmen, production only resumed on 17 August 1850. The Boulton presses struck 5-, 3-, and 2-kopeck coins, while the Uhlhorn presses struck smaller denominations of 1, ½, and ¼ kopeck. In 1853–1855, a new two-story auxiliary building was built on the right bank, housing a forge, a locksmith's shop, a die shop, and auxiliary rooms. By the time the mint's reconstruction was completed in 1855, the Mechanical Factory had placed two 8-horsepower steam engines at its disposal. During this period, the mint received annual orders for 600,000–700,000 rubles' worth of coins in silver at the 32-ruble rate.

In the summer of 1855, Finance Minister Pyotr Fyodorovich Brock ordered that output be brought up to the 3 million rubles planned under the 1849 decree, and then that striking be halted until further notice. The plan was fulfilled by 16 November 1855, after which the mint stopped work and the equipment began to be mothballed. But almost immediately, an order came from Brock to resume striking 1-, 2-, 3-, and 5-kopeck coins, with an urgent caravan to be sent off in June of the following year. Striking resumed on 28 December 1855, and in September 1857 a new decree arrived with an order to continue striking, revised upward to 2 million rubles for 1858. The city pond was shallow in these years, so existing steam engines had to be hastily upgraded and new ones built. Up until 1866, average annual output was 2 million rubles, with record volumes of 2,265,327 rubles struck in 1860 and 2,821,976 rubles in 1865.

In 1863–1864, the mint received orders for 3 million rubles' worth of production annually. In 1865, minor upgrades were made to the rolling shop's equipment, which had been limiting the output of the other shops. On 21 March 1867, by personal decree, the mint received an order to strike copper coins at a 50-ruble rate, in denominations of ¼, ½, 1, 2, 3, and 5 kopecks. Approved die designs were received in June 1867, and production was up and running by January 1868. In May 1871, the mint shut down for repairs; until 1 January 1872, staff not involved in the repair work were laid off.

=== Final years and closure ===
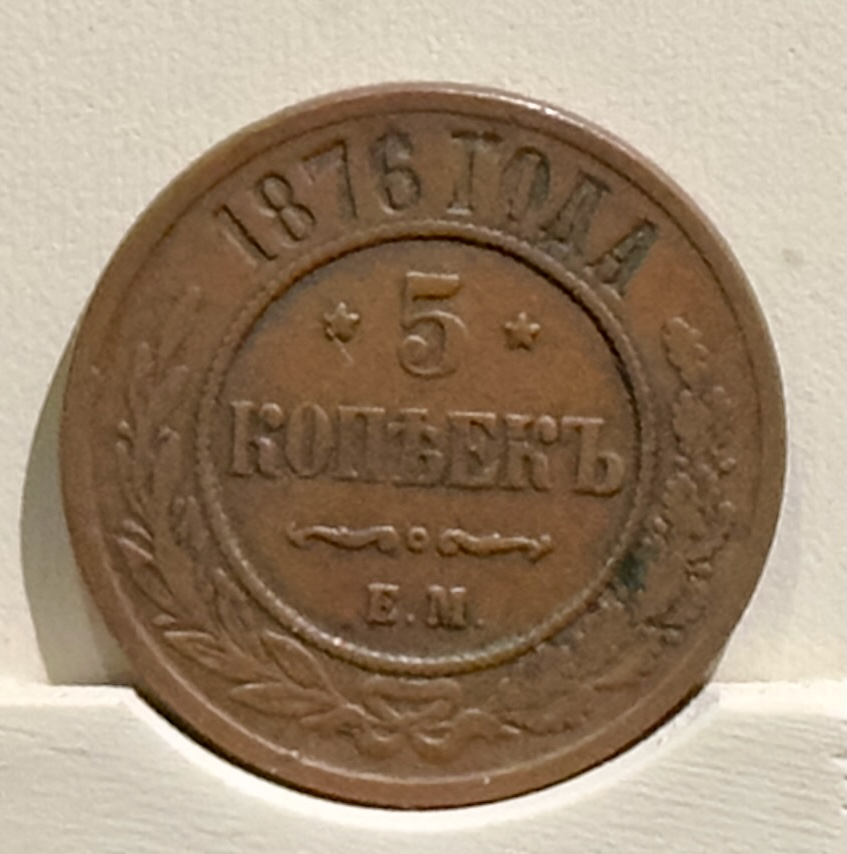
A 5-kopeck coin struck in the year the Yekaterinburg mint closed

By a personal decree of 21 March 1873, the Yekaterinburg and Saint Petersburg mints received orders to strike the 13th series of coins at a 32-ruble rate, totaling 3 million rubles. This series turned out to be the last coinage struck in pre-revolutionary Russia. On 27 March of the same year, a decree of the State Council was issued banning the striking of coins in Yekaterinburg from newly mined copper, and on 21 December of the same year a decree of Alexander II set the Yekaterinburg mint for closure in 1875. Following appeals from the Chief Mining Administrator, Ivan Pavlovich Ivanov, the Ministry of Finance agreed to extend the mint's operation until 1 January 1876, and the emperor ultimately approved 15 April 1876 as the closure date.

On 14 April 1876 — exactly 150 years after the striking of copper plates had begun — the mint was closed after completing its final order for 1.7 million rubles, and coin production was consolidated in St. Petersburg. Earlier, in February 1875, mining engineer M. M. Semyonov had sent the Ministry of Finance a report arguing that continued use of the Yekaterinburg mint's equipment was no longer worthwhile. The department's head at the time, Mikhail Khristoforovich Reutern, agreed with Semyonov's conclusions and ordered that all equipment directly used for coin production be destroyed on site, to prevent illegal minting. Part of the works' property was transferred to other state-owned works in the district, while a 36-horsepower steam engine and a turbine were moved to the Nizhneisetsky works. The enterprise's workers were enrolled in the urban meshchanstvo estate and granted a six-year exemption from municipal taxes and fees.

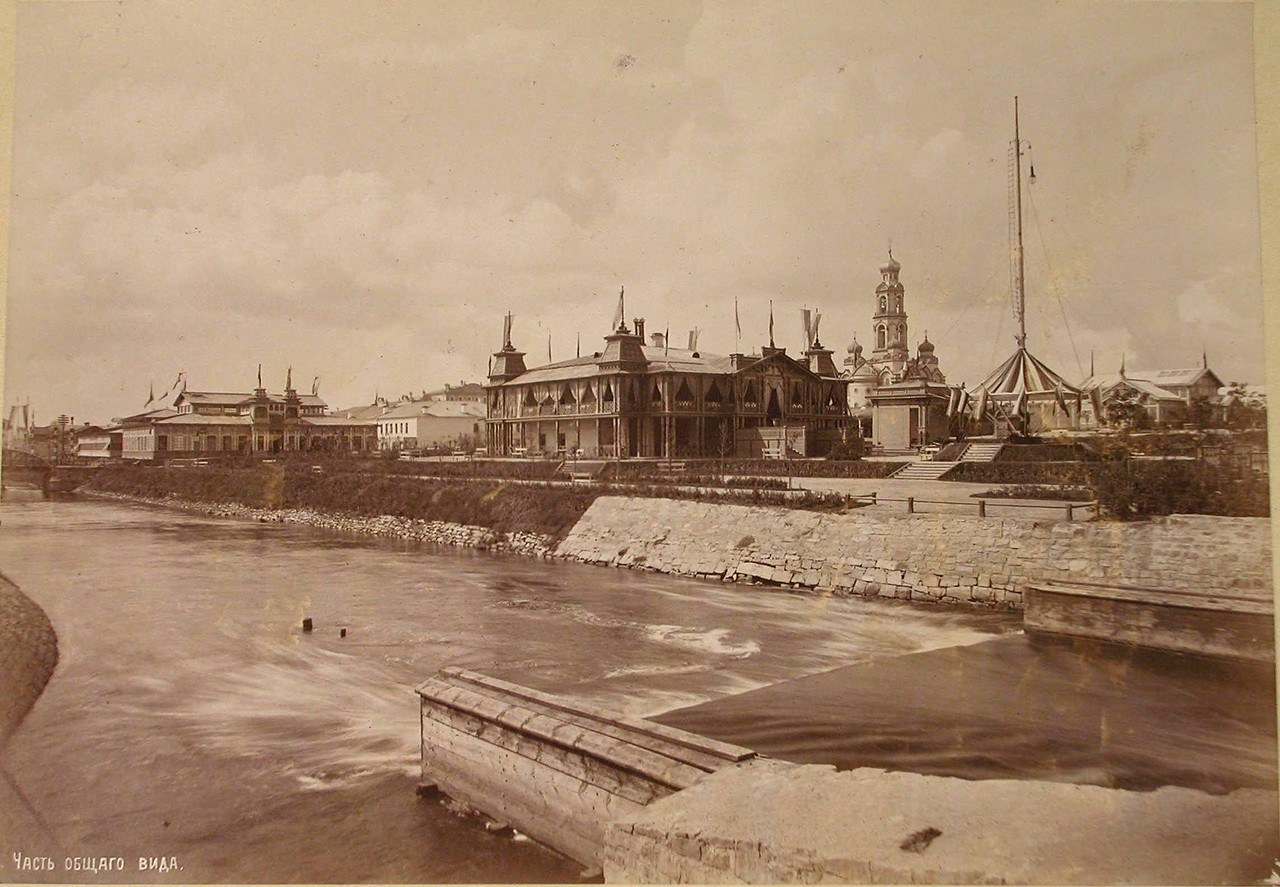
Pavilions of the 1887 Siberian-Ural Exhibition on the right bank below the dam

After the mint's closure, discussion began over what to do with the empty buildings. In October 1877, city mayor Mikhail Ananyevich Nurov approved a plan to house Turkish prisoners of war there, but the prisoners were never brought to Yekaterinburg; in 1880, a proposal to house a penal colony there was discussed but rejected by the City Duma. From August 1878 to 1883, part of the premises were used to house army recruits. On 10 December 1882, the Senate authorized an auction for the sale of the Yekaterinburg mint's property. By that time, bids for the unused buildings had been received from the Yekaterinburg merchants Ilya Ivanovich Simanov and Maxim Mikhailovich Skachkov. Owing to concerns about handing the city pond's dam over to private ownership, a decision — sanctioned by Alexander III — was made to transfer the buildings and grounds of the former mint to the Ministry of Railways.

In 1887, the Siberian-Ural Scientific-Industrial Exhibition was held on the mint's former grounds. In the early 1890s, in accordance with the decision taken earlier, the factory buildings were handed over to the railway workshops of the Ural Mining Railway, which in 1929 were converted into a railcar repair works (renamed after Voevodin in 1933), (Note: The full name was the Sverdlovsk Voevodin Railcar Repair Works of the USSR People's Commissariat of Railways.) and in 1946 were relocated away from the city center.

Over its entire existence, the Yekaterinburg mint produced more than 150 million rubles' worth of money.

== Equipment and buildings ==
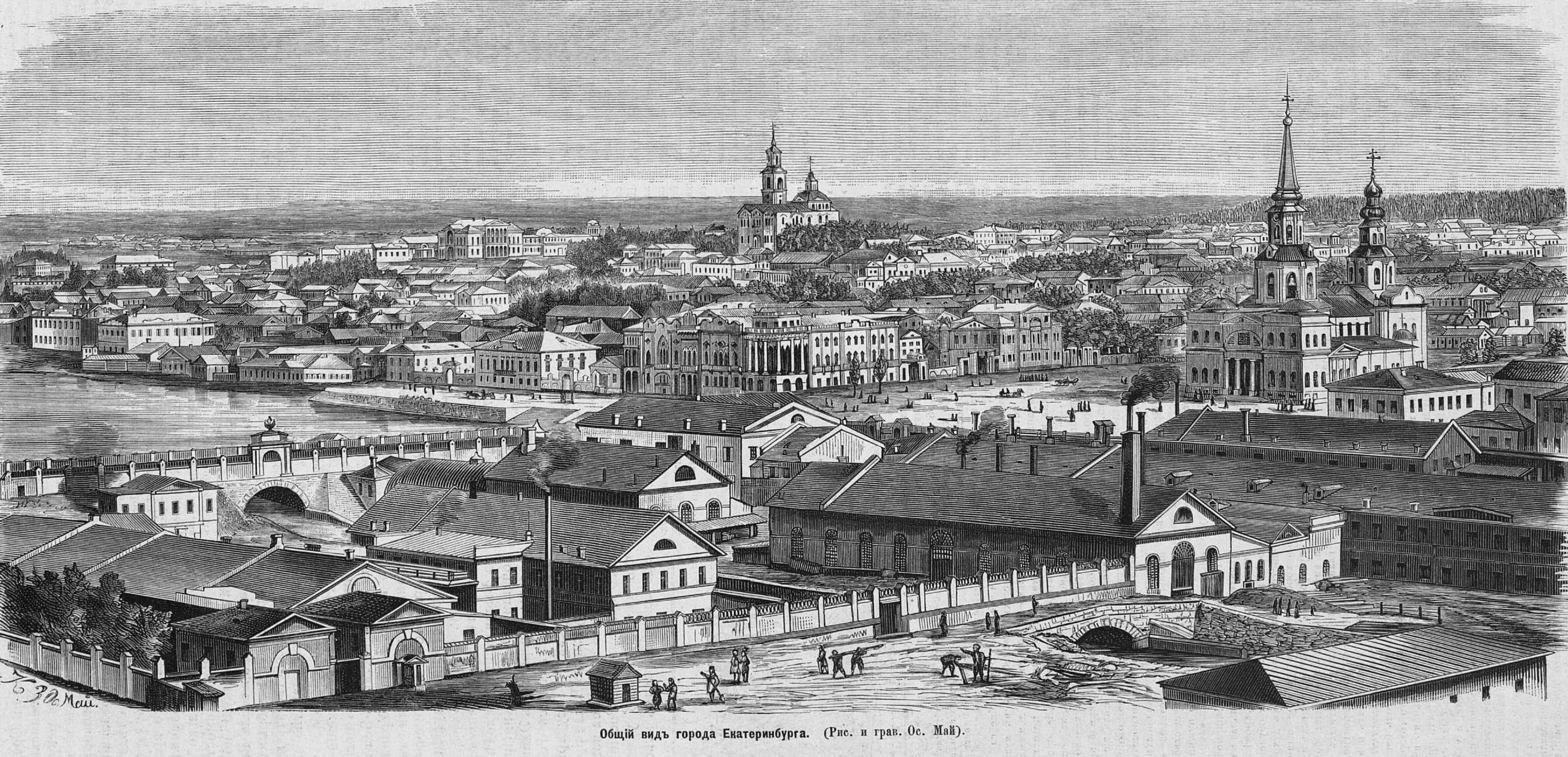
The Yekaterinburg mint, 1874 (in the foreground)

In 1735, the Yekaterinburg mint had a wooden main building and several outbuildings.

In 1759, a fire destroyed all the old wooden buildings, which were replaced with stone workshops: a rolling shop, two cutting shops, an edge-marking shop, a die-striking shop, and others. By 1797, the mint also had a stone rolling shop with 6 annealing furnaces and 5 rolling mills (2 heavy rollers, 2 rolling mills, and 1 slitting mill); two stone cutting shops with 26 machines (used to cut coin blanks from copper strips); a stone edge-marking shop with 2 furnaces — one for firing and one for annealing — and 29 machines (4 edge-marking machines, 3 rolling machines, 10 hand edge-marking machines, and 4 for finishing smooth blanks); and a stone die-striking shop with 14 presses (12 water-powered, for striking large coins, and 2 hand-operated, for striking small coins). There was also a steelmaking shop, a smelting shop for melting down trimmings, scraps, and scale, with 6 hearths (5 refining hearths and 1 purifying hearth, plus 2 hammers), an anchor shop for producing various factory supplies, a locksmith's shop, a forge, and auxiliary workshops. The equipment was powered by 35 water wheels, 17 of which drove the rolling shop alone. All these buildings stood beyond the dam on the right bank of the river.

Owing to the high volume of coin production in the late 18th century, part of the Yekaterinburg works' equipment and buildings was reallocated to serve the mint's needs. The trip-hammer and sheet-metal shops handled the forging of copper, and all the cement steel smelted at the works was used to make dies for striking coins. During this period, the works effectively became an auxiliary operation subordinate to the mint. After the works closed in 1808, its equipment and buildings were transferred entirely to the mint.

In 1778, machinist apprentice V. P. Kostrichkin designed a new edge-marking machine. In 1801, master craftsman Vasily Uglev created two models of coin-striking presses and a cutting mill. In 1805, under-shikhtmeister I. V. Timofeyev designed a device for cutting coin blanks. Between 1800 and 1805, Lev Fyodorovich Sabakin, a mechanic and inventor who worked for the Mining Administration in Yekaterinburg, designed a die-striking machine for the mint. The Yekaterinburg State Mechanical Factory was formed on the basis of Sabakin's workshop in 1837. It was subsequently rebuilt and expanded several times, eventually occupying almost the entire left-bank portion of the factory grounds.

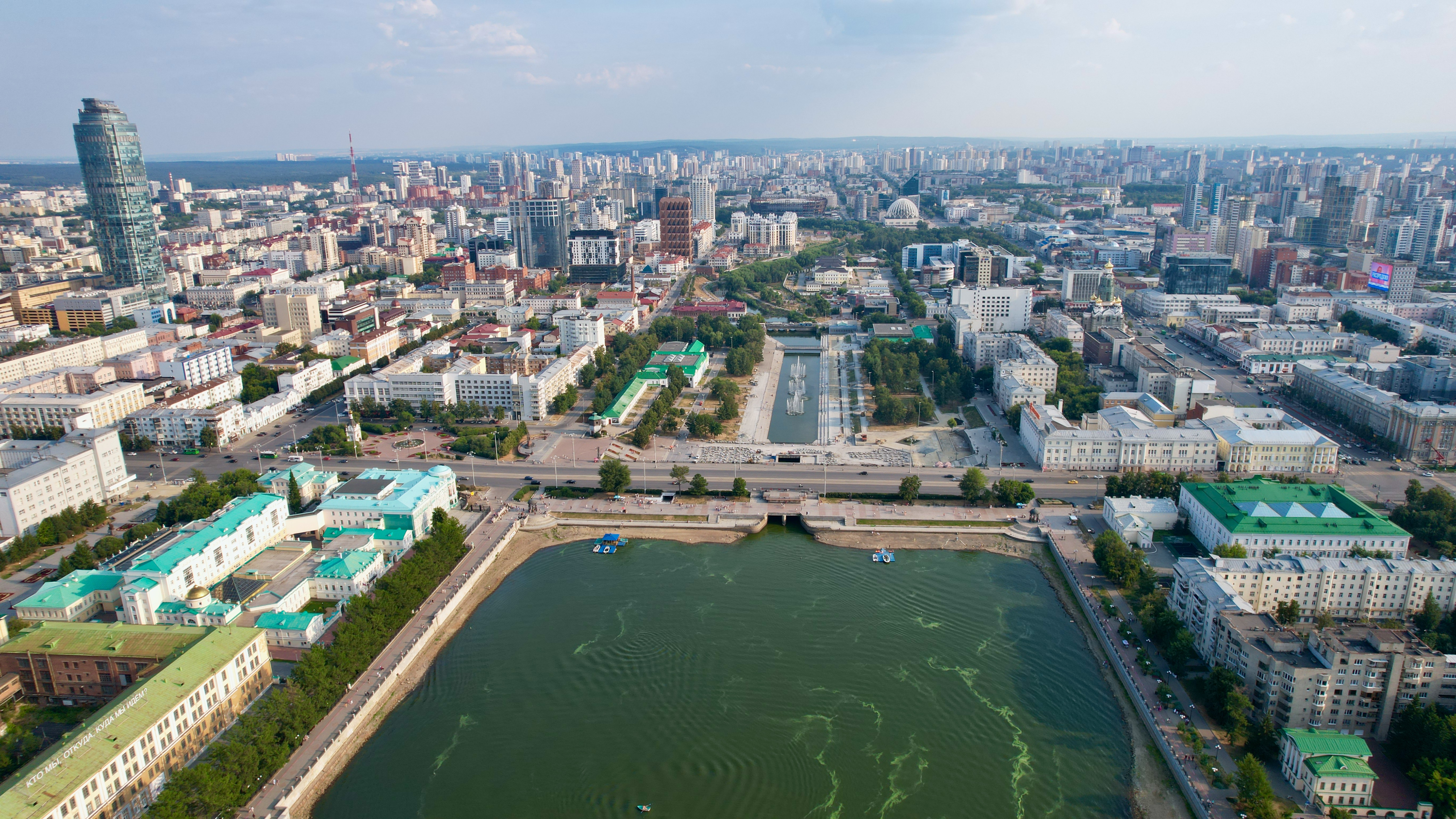
Aerial view of the dam and Historical Square in Yekaterinburg

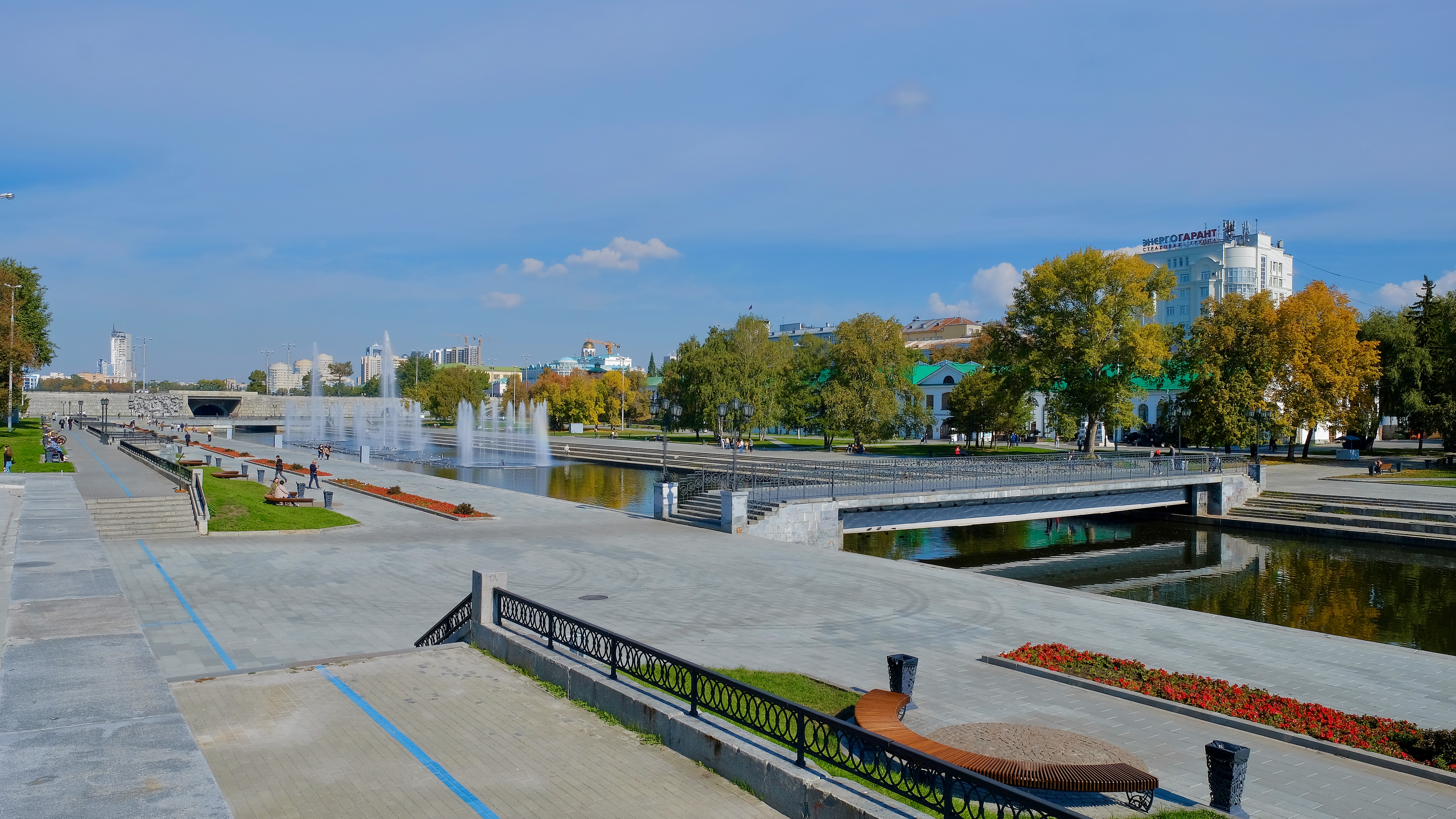
View of Historical Square

According to Pavel Yegorovich Tomilov's Description of the Works of the Ural Range, in the early 19th century the mint comprised two buildings on either bank of the Iset River. The right-bank building housed two rolling shops, a cutting shop, an edge-marking shop, and two die-striking shops. The rolling shops were equipped with 8 furnaces for heating copper and 10 rolling machines; the cutting shop had 16 cutting presses; the edge-marking shop had 4 barrels for cleaning copper blanks, 4 furnaces for firing and drying, and 2 water-wheel-powered edge-marking presses; the die-striking shops had 6 furnaces for heating blanks and 34 coining presses. The right bank also housed a counting-house storeroom. The left-bank building contained a smelting shop with 4 refining hearths, an anchor shop with a forge containing 2 water-powered hammers and 22 hearths, and a tool shop. Formally, the anchor shop, forge, and tool shop belonged to the Mining Department, being remnants of the former Yekaterinburg works. A stone bridge was built across the Iset connecting the two buildings.

From 1808, the works' dam — built between March and 11 September 1723 — came under the Yekaterinburg mint's control. The dam, designed by Leonty Stepanovich Zlobin, dam master of the Nevyansk Works, was 209 meters long, 42 meters wide, and 6.5 meters high. In the 1840s–1850s, under the direction of hydraulic engineer V. I. Rozhkov, small and large water turbines were installed to power the mint's machinery and equipment.

In 1834, the entire mint grounds, including part of the dam, were enclosed, to a design by architect Mikhail Pavlovich Malakhov, with a brick wall topped with cast-iron railings and urns. In 1839–1844, a thorough reconstruction of the mint was carried out to a design by architects Malakhov and A. Spiring, with the participation of mechanic Pyotr Eduardovich Tet. The small architectural features are attributed to architect Karl Reingoldovich Tursky. The reconstruction added gates (western, eastern, northeastern, and southeastern) with forged iron grilles. Following the 1972–1973 restoration, fragments of the walls and four gates survive.

The southeastern gate was built later than the others and forms a two-part, symmetrical composition of two stone wicket gates with a carriageway between them. It stands diagonally to the street intersection and consists of two stone piers shaped as false wicket gates, decorated only on the street-facing side, with an upper rectangular parapet bearing a four-sided gas lantern on an ornamental wrought-iron bracket. The remaining gates are of a uniform type, each with a wicket formed by an arched opening, flanked on both sides by engaged columns. The gates and walls are brick with metal ornamentation, plastered and painted white. Over time, the grounds of the former mint became part of Yekaterinburg's Historical Square.

After the 1840s–1850s modernization, the following equipment was housed in the two new stone buildings. The main processing building contained a copper-smelting shop with 4 smelting hearths; a rolling shop with 2 heating furnaces and 2 polishing machines; a cutting shop with 15 cutting machines and 6 cleaning barrels; an edge-marking shop with 8 machines; and a die-striking shop with 7 Boulton presses and 8 Uhlhorn presses. The auxiliary building housed a die-cutting shop with 4 machines and a Jonval turbine; a forge with 12 hearths; and a turning workshop with 47 lathes.

In 1876, after coin production in Yekaterinburg ceased, the mint buildings were handed over to the railway workshops of the Ural Mining Railway, and the coin dies and equipment deemed unfit for further use were destroyed.

== Staff ==
In 1763, the Yekaterinburg mint employed 375 people. In 1770, 575; and in 1797, 664 people (188 managers and clerical staff, 476 craftsmen and laborers), along with 9,640 ascribed state peasants. In the early 19th century, the enterprise had 400 people on its staff.

In 1812, the mint's staff numbered more than 800, and in 1860 the enterprise employed 1,396 craftsmen. During periods of intensive production and large coin orders, staff numbers rose to 2,000 or more.

Among the mint's workers, die-cutters were considered a kind of elite, since their work demanded a high level of skill. In the early 19th century, die-cutters were forbidden from being sent to other jobs or transferred to other shops.

Since the mint had become Yekaterinburg's principal employer after the ironworks closed, most of the city's residents were connected to its operations in some way. Disruptions at the mint affected the well-being of the entire city. As of 1855, more than half the city's population depended on the mint's operation, and workers' wages were expected to support their families as well.

== Output and production volumes ==
The Yekaterinburg mint's coin collection on display at the Museum of History and Archaeology of the Urals
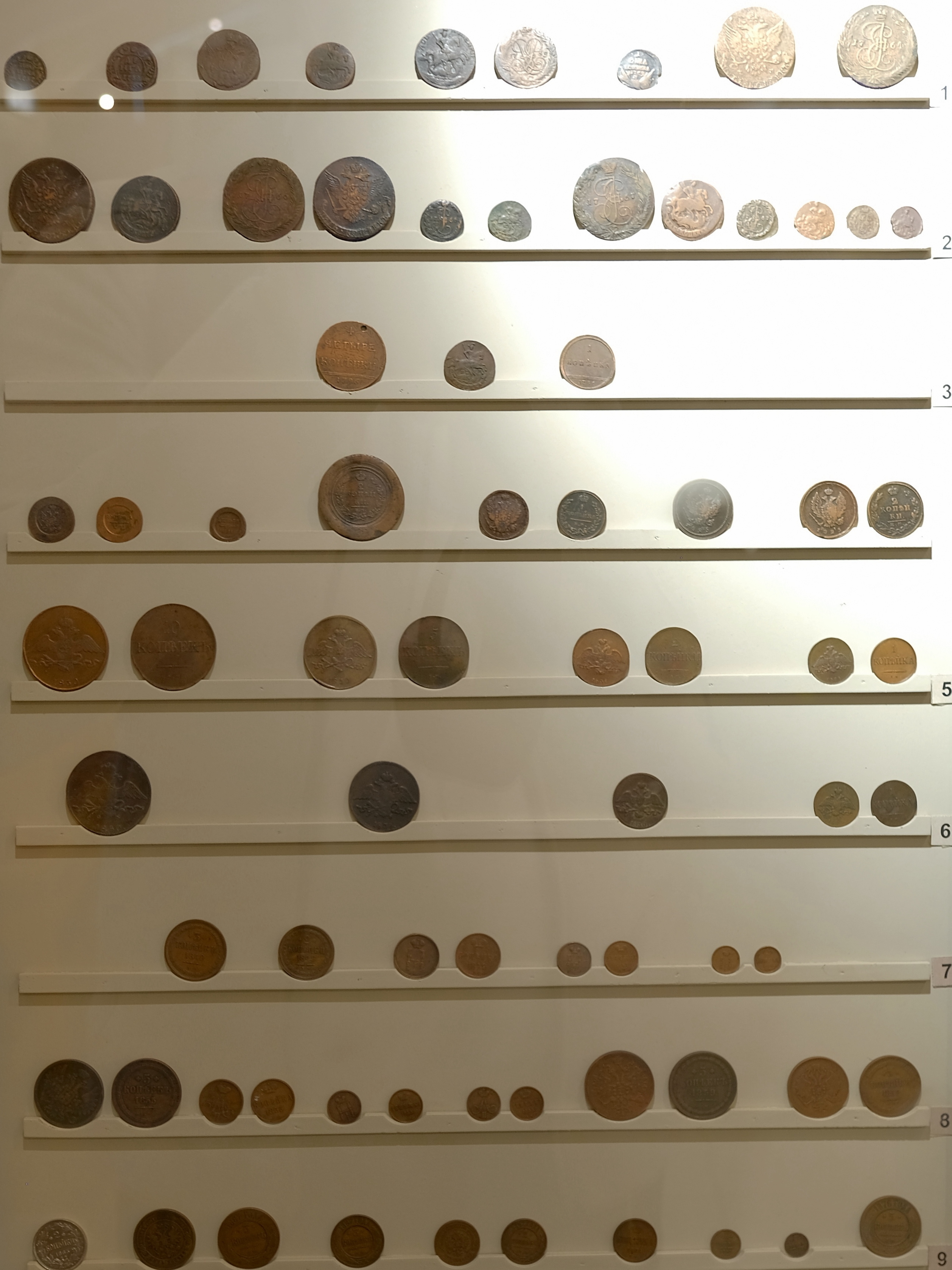
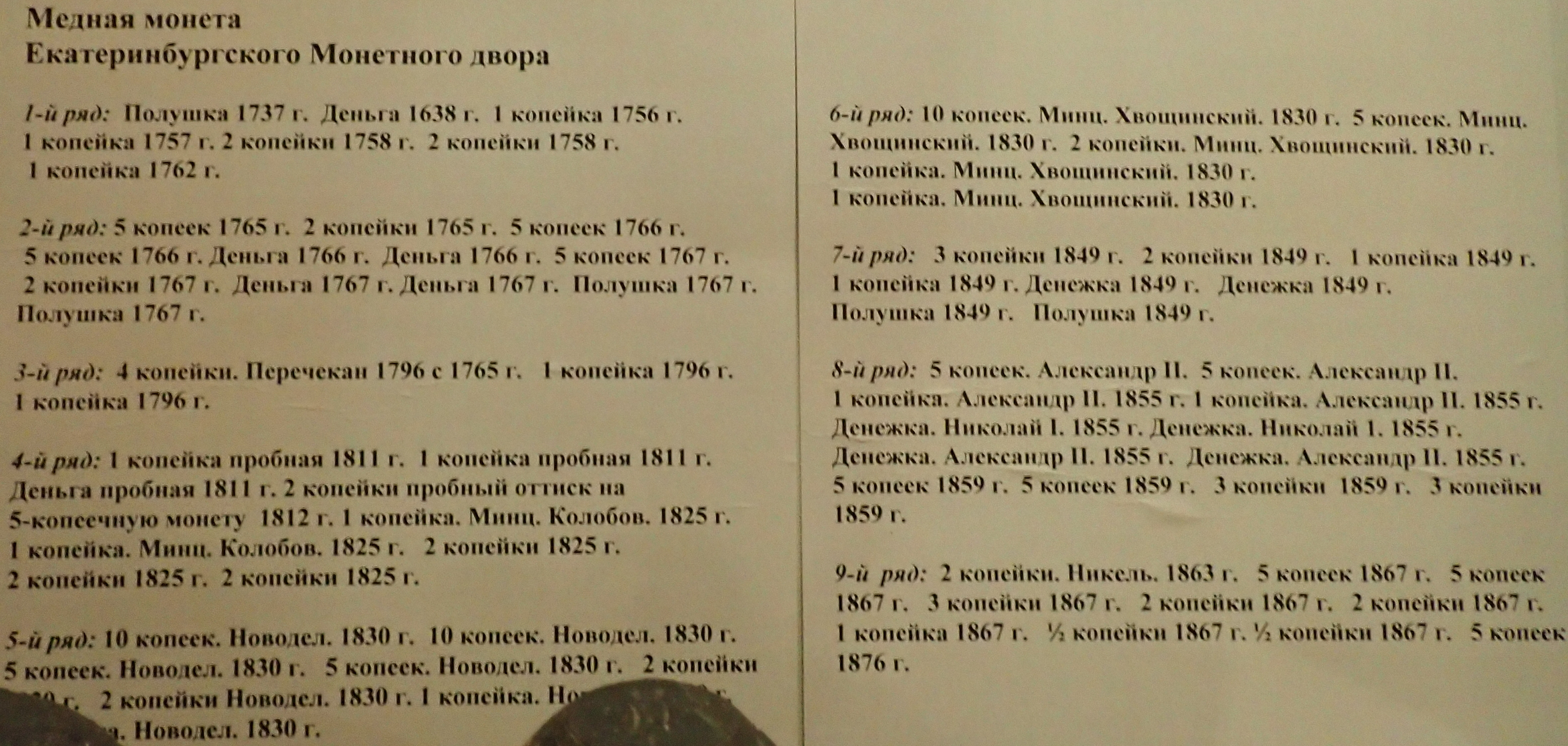

In its early period, the Yekaterinburg Plate Yard struck square plates ranging in denomination from one ruble down to a ten-kopeck piece (grivna), each bearing a stamp in each of its four corners depicting a double-headed eagle crowned with three imperial crowns and holding a scepter and orb. On the eagle's breast was an oval shield bearing Empress Catherine I's monogram, made up of two letters J and two letters E. In the center of the plate was a stamp giving the value, year, and place of minting: Price. Ruble. Yekaterinburh. 1725.

In 1726, square five-kopeck and one-kopeck pieces were added alongside the ruble, half-ruble, quarter-ruble, and ten-kopeck denominations. On the 1726 five-kopeck coin, an eagle was placed in the center, flanked left and right by the two halves of the year, "17" and "26," with the inscription five kopecks above and Yekaterinburh below. In another variant, the eagle's breast bore a shield with the letter E. On the square five-kopeck coins, the word Yekaterinburg appeared in three variant spellings. The reverse of these coins was left blank.

In 1727, five-kopeck copper blanks worth 19,733 rubles 15 kopecks were cut. In 1727–1734, the Plate Yard also produced copper tableware and bells. In 1742–1751, 277,697,754 blanks were produced, worth 1,861,962 rubles 94.5 kopecks. In 1736–1741 and 1748–1751, round national copper coinage — dengas and polushkas — was also issued, to a total value of 1,785,696 rubles 98 kopecks. In 1735, 7,000 poods of coin were produced; in 1750, 36,000 poods; and in 1800, 107,000 poods. By the end of the 18th century, Yekaterinburg was striking about 90% of all Russian coinage, consuming two-thirds of all copper smelted in the country.

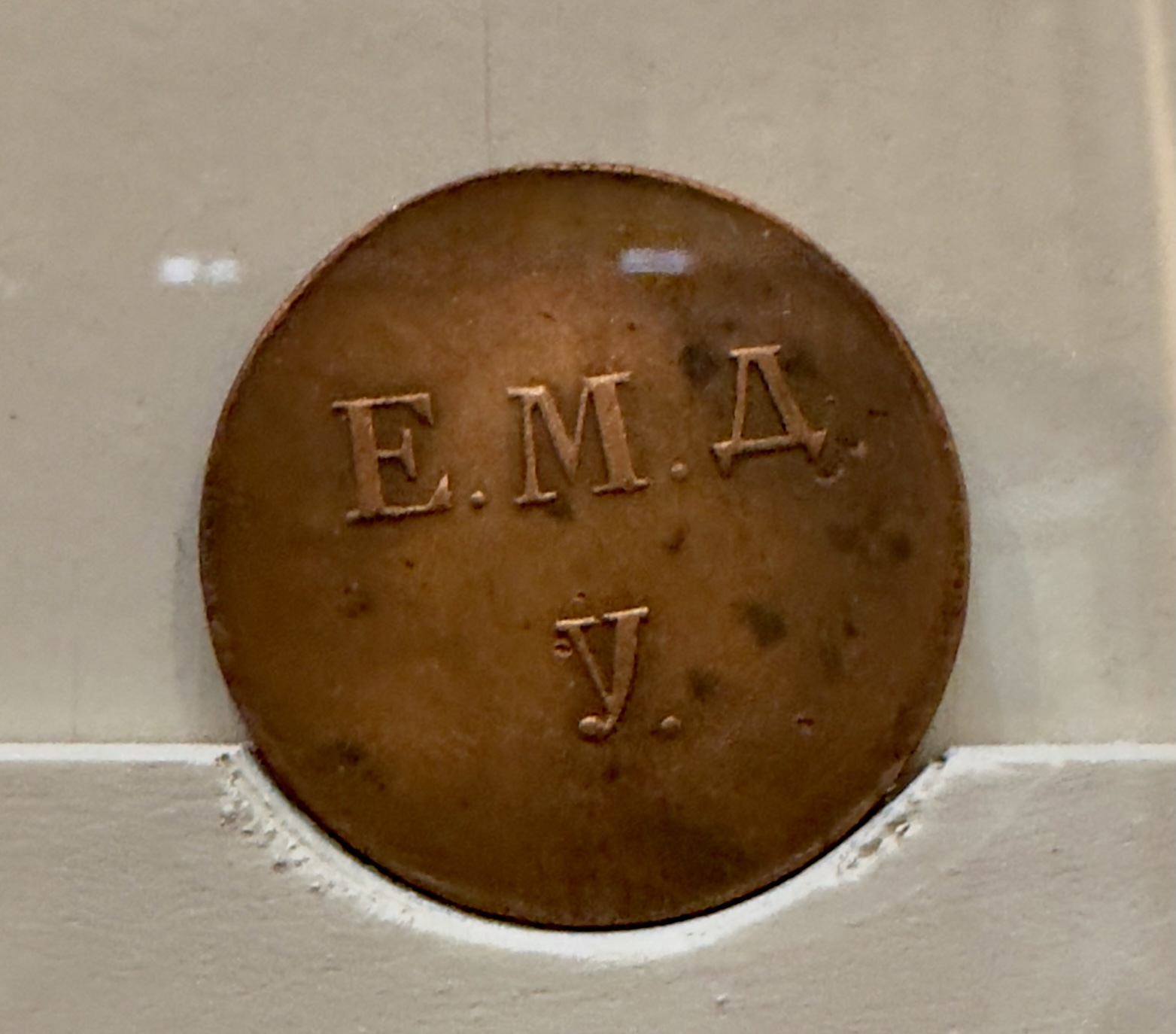
A charcoal tally tag

Since the late 1740s, in addition to coins, the mint also struck copper tags, widely used to record charcoal, ore, and lime received from ascribed peasants.

In the early 19th century, the mint's daily output was 600–700 poods of copper blanks, worth 9,000–11,000 rubles. The blanks were dried on cast-iron pans in special furnaces, then fed to the edge-marking presses. After edge-marking, the coins were struck.

During periods when, for various reasons, no coins were being struck, the mint produced copper tableware, bells, and other copper goods. In 1847, at the request of the artillery department, the mint began producing sheet copper for making percussion caps.

Over its entire period of operation, the mint issued more than 500 varieties of copper coins, and several collections have been assembled. (Note: A detailed illustrated catalog of Yekaterinburg mint coins is given in the book by E. A. Grigoryev, V. N. Meshcheryakov, and A. V. Chernoukhov.) One such collection was donated in 1907 to the Ural Society of Natural History Lovers and is now held at the Sverdlovsk Regional Museum of Local Lore.

The mint also produced copper seals, medals, plaques, and tokens. From 1855 to 1876, under the direction of staff artist and head of the medal-engraving department Mikhail Denisovich Kanaev, more than 120 designs of bronze medals were made to order from standard patterns, dedicated to political figures, members of the imperial family, and historical events. After the mint closed in 1876, on Kanaev's recommendation, the artist Grigory Vasilyevich Druzhinin bought up samples of the medals and, the following year, opened an experimental workshop in Kasli producing medallions and medals in bronze and cast iron, which continued until Druzhinin's death in 1880. The 1896 price lists of the Kasli Ironworks listed 157 medals and 23 medallions produced in Kanaev's workshop from models originating at the Yekaterinburg mint.

Annual coin output in rubles

- 1736–1741 and 1748–1751 — combined 1,785,697
- 1751–1755 — no coins struck
- 1756–1761 — average of 1–1.5 million per year
- 1762 — 2,937,075
- 1765 — 2,089,760
- 1770 — 2,565,411
- 1771 — 2,917,275
- 1772 — 2,370,101
- 1778 — 2,382,907
- 1780 — 2,550,352
- 1783 — 1,507,813
- 1784 — 1,802,942
- 1785 — 2,153,510
- 1786 — 1,522,814
- 1787 — 954,400
- 1788 — 2,457,042
- 1789 — 2,272,830
- 1790 — 1,277,738
- 1791 — 1,193,468
- 1792 — 1,308,825
- 1793 — 1,141,042
- 1794 — 1,059,069
- 1795 — 846,467
- 1796 — 18,263

- 1802 — 711,362
- 1803 — 1,591,916
- 1804 — 1,313,384
- 1805 — 827,345
- 1806 — 1,920,784
- 1807 — 533,333
- 1808 — 500,027
- 1809 — 507,013
- 1810–1817 — combined 14 million
- 1811 — 2,546,042
- 1812 — 2,641,714
- 1820 — 1,660,000
- 1830 — 330,008
- 1831–1838 — 1.5 to 3 million per year
- 1839 — 270,500
- 1840 — 634,668

- 1841–1876 — combined 38 million (no coins struck in 1845–1849)
- 1868 — 1,768,250
- 1869–1870 — average of 1.7 million per year
- 1872–1874 — average of 1 million per year
- 1875 — 1,368,800

Annual coin output in thousands of pieces

Figures for individual years are listed twice where reminting or a change of monetary rate took place during that period.

Year	10 kopecks	5 kopecks	3 kopecks	2 kopecks	Kopeck	½ kopeck	¼ kopeck	Note
1736	0	0	0	0	0	33436	3156	
1737	0	0	0	0	0	37015	3924	
1738	0	0	0	0	0	36543	2856	
1739	0	0	0	0	0	25466	1800	
1740	0	0	0	0	0	17066	811	
1741	0	0	0	0	0	0	0	
1748	0	0	0	0	0	74808	1488	
1749	0	0	0	0	0	47920	1880	
1750	0	0	0	0	0	48444	1144	
1751	0	0	0	0	0	27624	576	
1755	0	0	0	0	2887	0	0	
1756	0	0	0	0	23764	0	0	Reminting and regular minting
1757	0	0	0	0	17038	0	0	8-ruble rate
1757	0	0	0	31894	6548	3068	1508	
1758	0	17604	0	28629	5081	571	536	
1759	0	23357	0	8119	3322	1574	1177	
1760	0	25887	0	3953	0	0	1	
1761	0	26282	0	15892	0	0	0	
1762	0	6813	0	4930	0	0	0	Reminting and minting, totaling 2.9 million rubles
1763	0	36527	0	1401	0	0	0	
1764	0	34048	0	2322	43	6	0	
1765	0	41109	0	1714	1	1	0	
1766	0	26562	0	1662	0	2841	3107	
1767	0	37020	0	1294	0	2623	4311	
1768	0	28542	0	911	0	2422	5684	
1769	0	39441	0	1588	0	1450	3778	
1770	0	48480	0	5311	0	4020	6040	
1771	0	57053	0	1944	0	2910	4470	
1772	0	46265	0	2433	0	1160	960	
1773	0	38829	0	3225	0	451	198	
1774	0	14535	0	645	0	20	0	
1775	0	30487	0	1476	0	508	318	
1776	0	21454	0	1332	0	0	60	
1777	0	37429	0	1596	0	0	0	
1778	0	47142	0	1291	0	0	0	
1779	0	39732	0	73	0	0	0	
1780	0	51007	0	0	0	0	0	
1781	0	43521	0	0	0	0	0	
1782	0	37375	0	0	0	0	0	
1783	0	30156	0	0	0	0	0	
1784	0	36059	0	0	0	0	0	
1785	0	43070	0	0	0	0	0	
1786	0	30377	0	0	0	573	450	
1787	0	19088	0	0	0	0	0	
1788	0	49141	0	0	0	0	0	
1789	0	25841	0	2878	6433	2009	2037	
1790	0	39995	0	4765	1862	1235	1019	
1791	0	23739	0	371	0	0	0	
1792	0	26177	0	0	0	0	0	
1793	0	22736	0	0	0	933	0	
1794	0	20950	0	0	756	797	9	
1795	0	15531	0	1546	2286	3195	71	
1796	0	1949	0	619	523	0	261	
1796	0	0	0	4295	0	0	0	Reminting
1797	0	0	0	4914	523	130	0	
1798	0	0	0	56528	19243	5194	1510	
1799	0	0	0	55641	23789	7	11	
1800	0	0	0	28156	9793	0	0	
1801	0	0	0	27380	1708	26	0	
1802	0	12593	0	45798	7577	0	0	
1803	0	31820	0	298	0	0	12	
1804	0	26268	0	0	0	0	0	
1805	0	16519	0	0	114	41	25	
1806	0	38416	0	0	0	0	0	
1807	0	10667	0	0	0	0	0	
1808	0	10001	0	0	0	0	0	
1809	0	10140	0	0	0	0	0	
1810	0	15802	0	0	0	0	0	16-ruble rate
1810	0	0	0	79364	507	36	0	24-ruble rate
1811	0	0	0	127003	574	26	0	
1812	0	0	0	13209	845	72	0	
1813	0	0	0	64479	30	24	0	
1814	0	0	0	110000	0	0	0	
1815	0	0	0	44970	31	59	0	
1816	0	0	0	64150	0	0	0	
1817	0	0	0	75000	0	0	0	
1818	0	0	0	60625	55750	23410	0	
1819	0	0	0	10047	19390	1345	0	
1820	0	0	0	75180	15640	0	0	
1821	0	0	0	55170	10160	0	0	
1822	0	0	0	44868	10265	0	0	
1823	0	0	0	44935	10350	0	0	
1824	0	0	0	36293	0	0	0	
1825	0	0	0	73856	370	545	0	
1826	0	0	0	50450	1145	1080	0	
1827	0	0	0	34065	2647	2165	0	
1828	0	0	0	1448	43015	0	0	
1829	0	0	0	13790	48266	0	0	
1830	0	0	0	15450	2100	0	0	
1831	2640	41110	0	0	13050	0	0	
1832	7620	30080	0	0	3400	0	0	
1833	6969	14332	0	251	2883	0	0	
1834	9134	41795	0	0	5020	0	0	
1835	5175	41763	0	0	6570	0	0	
1836	7240	31332	0	0	2100	0	0	
1837	9728	19743	0	16845	4890	0	0	
1838	5468	22430	0	6623	1044	0	0	
1839	350	1400	0	8250	50	0	0	36-ruble rate
1839	0	0	7011	7617	10516	5810	3211	16-ruble rate
1840	0	0	5250	9347	20778	10999	10973	
1841	0	0	13417	14999	19341	3384	3231	
1842	0	0	13700	12446	13581	3600	3600	
1843	0	0	14578	11020	12520	2580	1664	
1844	0	0	4840	5500	0	480	0	
1845	0	0	0	0	0	0	0	
1846	0	0	0	0	0	0	0	
1847	0	0	0	0	0	0	0	
1848	0	0	0	0	0	0	0	
1849	0	0	0	0	0	0	0	
1850	0	373	185	2206	1843	3562	5184	
1851	0	2241	3462	8356	4790	6426	7776	
1852	0	3961	5459	6874	14006	14672	1178	
1853	0	1479	3719	7561	21328	12243	5382	
1854	0	356	1351	4541	22397	13754	4538	
1855	0	740	2768	8587	24594	20511	6442	
1856	0	5146	6701	9167	10642	6000	6000	
1857	0	8675	4726	3359	5359	6000	6000	
1858	0	19561	10662	10028	13731	11147	6970	
1859	0	19441	15821	14772	11059	5871	3834	
1860	0	25260	17343	19239	8306	2838	0	
1861	0	28022	7738	18547	10130	2277	192	
1862	0	22055	10374	16890	10165	3072	992	
1863	0	22511	3939	21703	6544	1011	301	
1864	0	26042	248	14175	4400	566	403	
1865	0	38933	5749	26921	14230	560	122	
1866	0	24767	6611	21890	12304	333	326	
1867	0	11697	1785	8970	5851	390	83	32-ruble rate
1867	0	1459	160	150	0	0	0	50-ruble rate
1868	0	23019	6086	18200	6305	1190	700	
1869	0	20277	5526	22174	10230	592	615	
1870	0	21158	5018	23684	9785	510	435	
1871	0	6304	1585	7058	2880	222	155	
1872	0	11890	3018	12734	5713	365	540	
1873	0	13052	4704	7364	5213	963	822	
1874	0	12879	4419	8551	5013	300	340	
1875	0	19624	3595	10451	6438	321	300	
1876	0	5329	890	2905	1755	0	0	
Total	54324	2053770	202438	1881128	725126	557400	137495	

== Legacy ==
By Resolution No. 624 of the Council of Ministers of the RSFSR, dated 4 December 1974, the surviving buildings and structures of the Yekaterinburg works — "the Mint" — were placed under protection as a federally significant object of Russia's cultural heritage.

In 2023, to mark Yekaterinburg's 300th anniversary, the city installed 90 commemorative manhole covers depicting the obverse of the 1763-series five-kopeck coin, bearing Catherine II's monogram, and the reverse of the 1872 series.

Commemorative manhole covers in Yekaterinburg
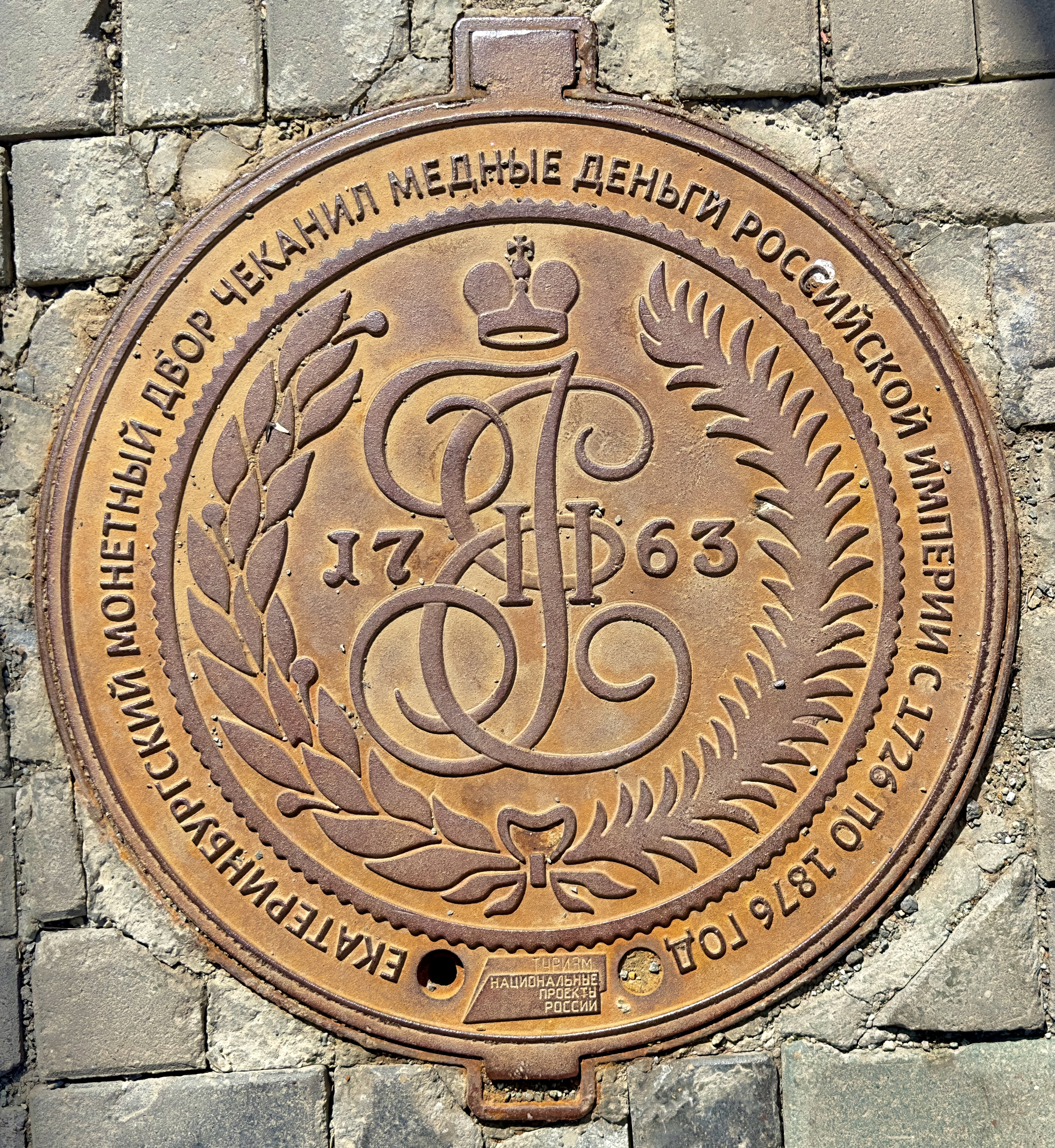
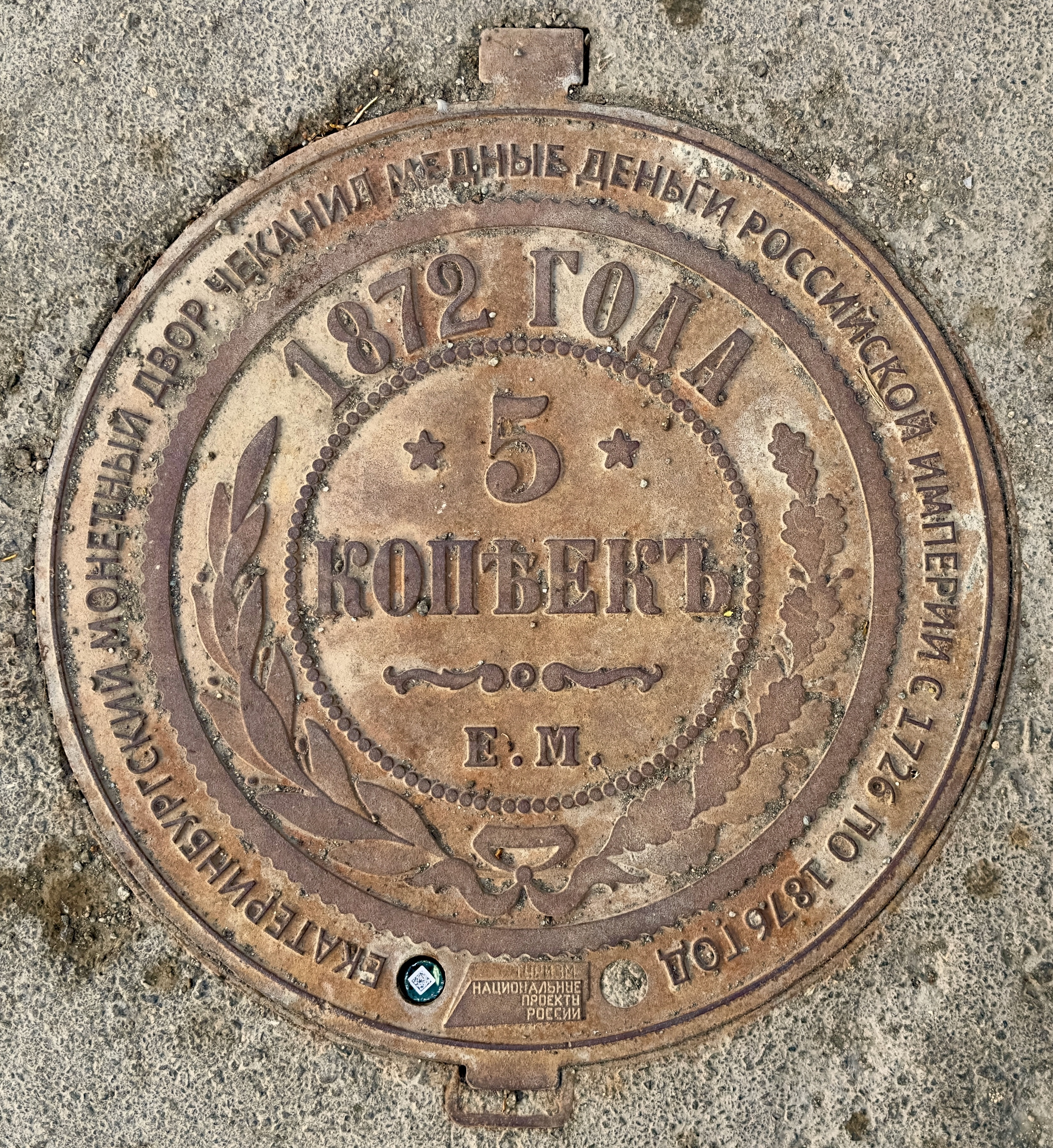
Surviving sections of the mint's fence

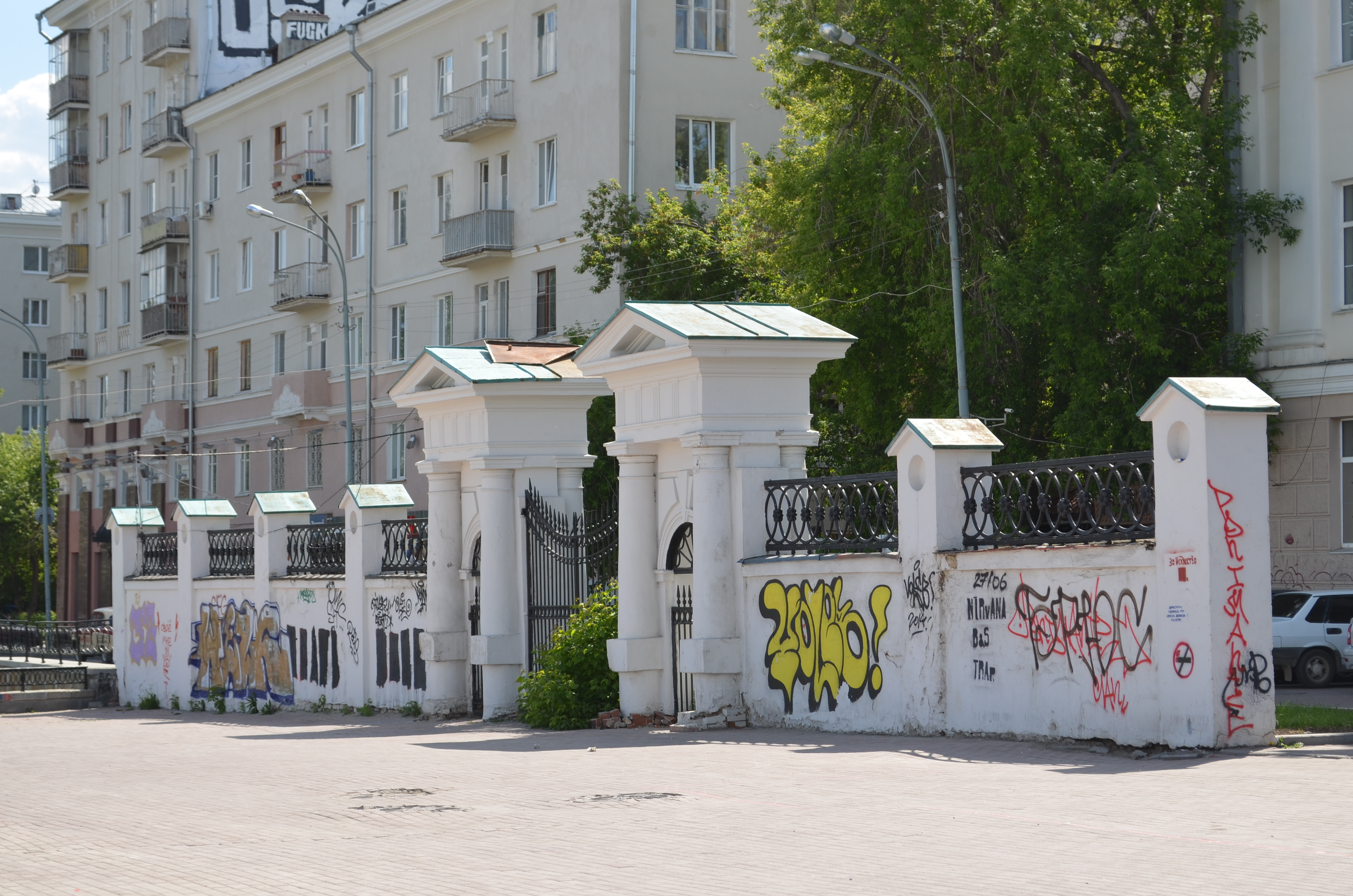
Western gate

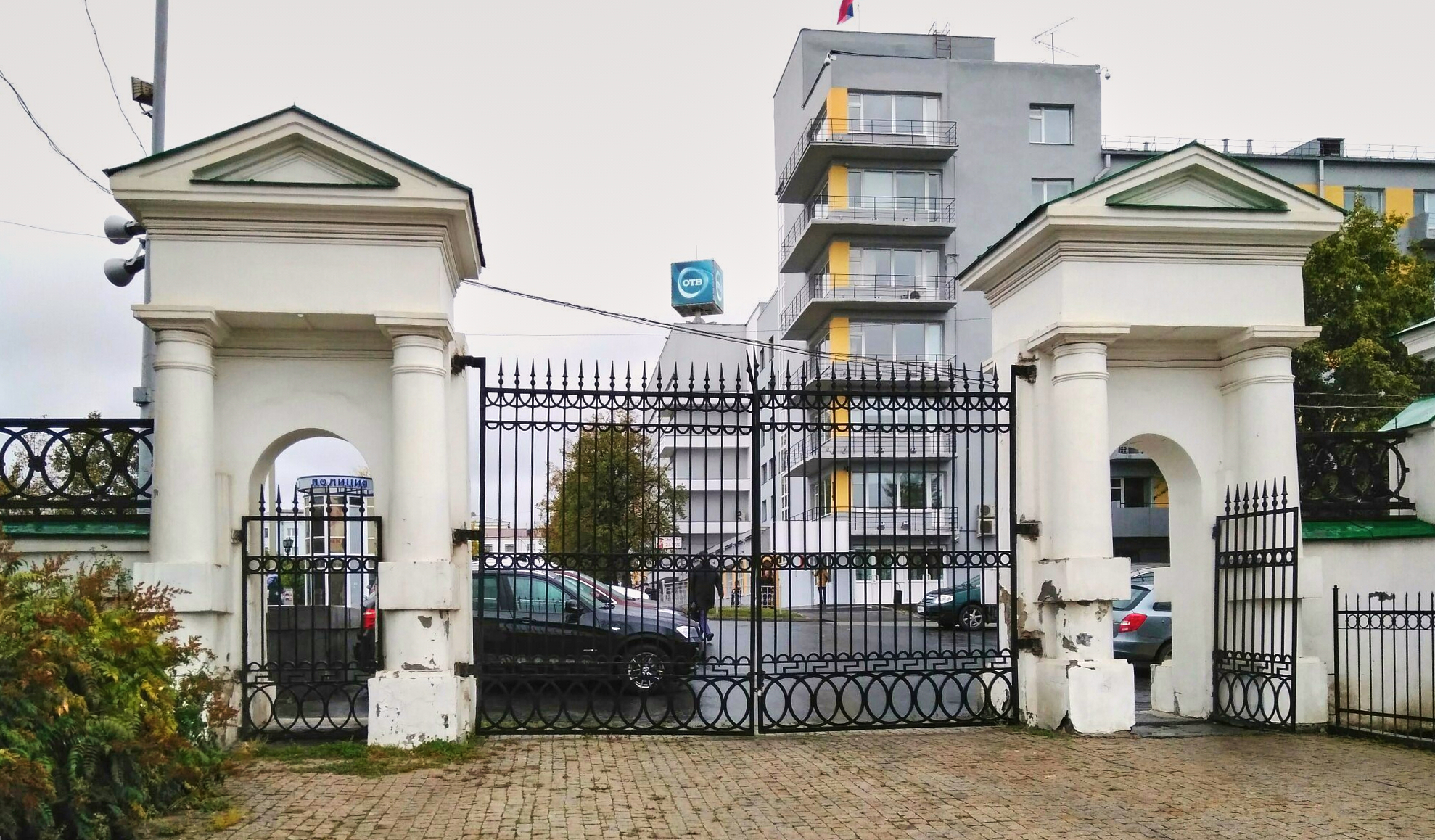
Northeastern gate

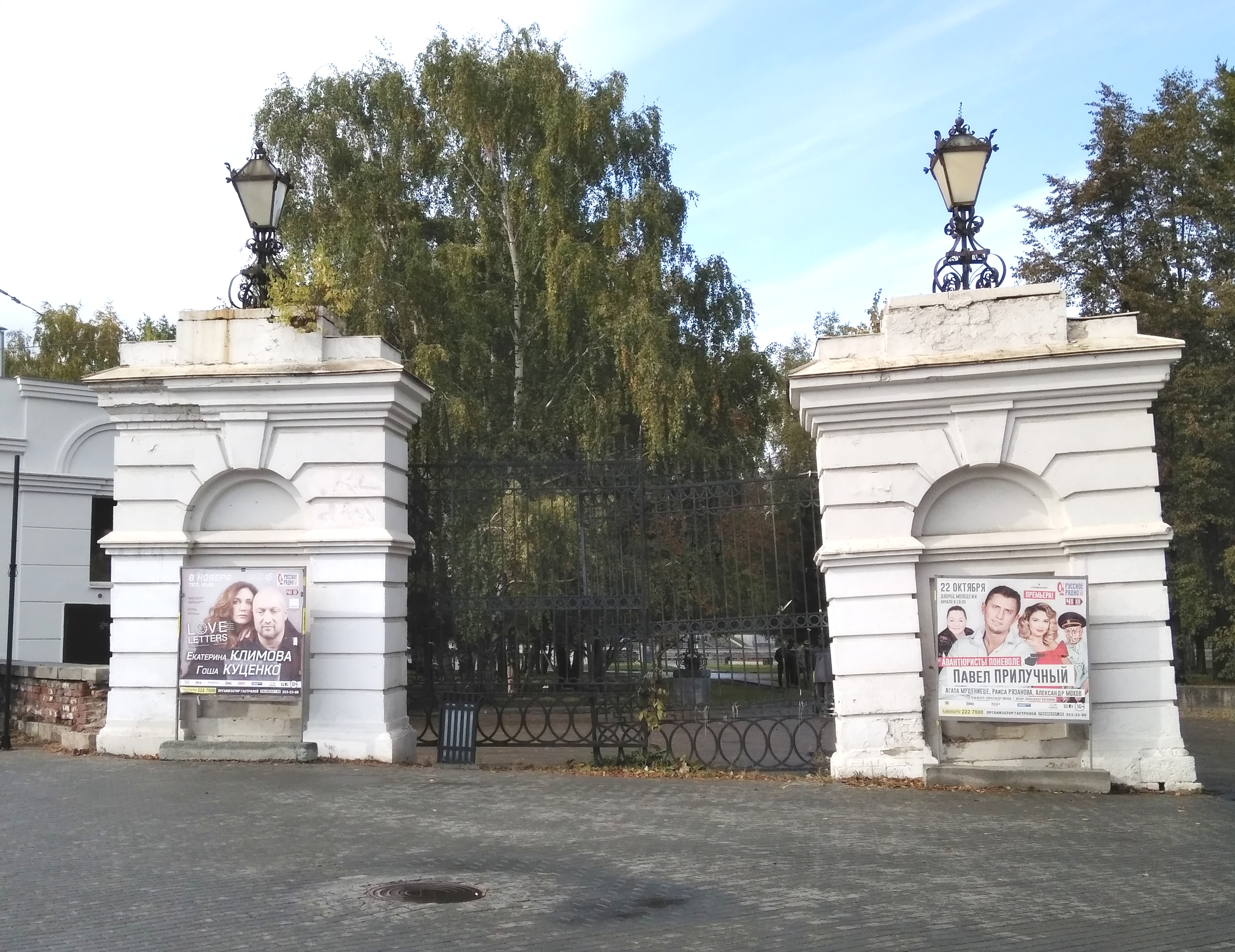
Southeastern gate

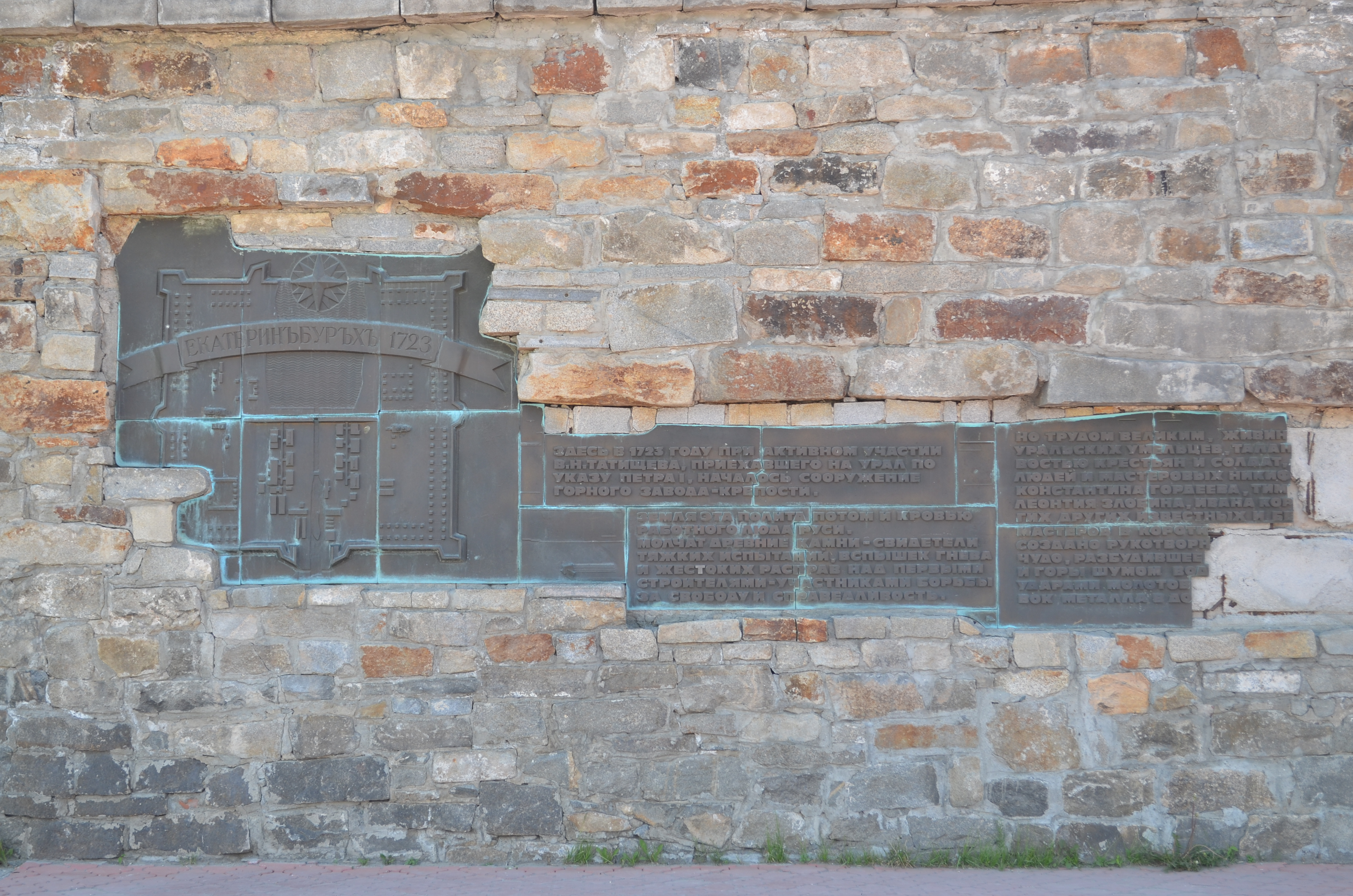
Western wall

A forest tract northeast of Yekaterinburg was assigned to the mint. After the enterprise closed, the historical name of the Mint Tract survived in the name of the settlement of Monetny and the railway station of Monetnaya.

== Bibliography ==
- Maslakov (2002). Екатеринбург: Энциклопедия [Yekaterinburg: Encyclopedia] (PDF) (in Russian). Yekaterinburg: Издательство Академкнига. p. 728. ISBN 5-93472-068-6.
- Tulisov, E. S. (2008). Екатеринбург: Листая страницы столетий (1723–2008) [Yekaterinburg: Turning the Pages of Centuries (1723–2008)] (in Russian). Екатеринбург: ИД «Сократ». p. 240. ISBN 978-5-88664-326-8.
- Bykov, V. M. (1923). Екатеринбург за двести лет (1723—1923) [Yekaterinburg over Two Hundred Years (1723–1923)] (in Russian). Yekaterinburg: Типография Гранит. p. 314.
- "Е. М." [E. M.]. Brockhaus and Efron Encyclopedic Dictionary (in Russian). Vol. XIa. СПб.: Энциклопедический словарь Брокгауза и Ефрона. 1894.
- Gavrilov, D. V. (2001). "Екатеринбургский монетный двор" [Yekaterinburg Mint] (PDF). Металлургические заводы Урала [Metallurgical Works of the Urals] (in Russian). Екатеринбург: Издательство Академкнига. pp. 190–191. ISBN 5-93472-057-0.
- Korepanov, N. S. (2023). "Екатеринбургский монетный двор" [Yekaterinburg Mint]. Екатеринбург: Энциклопедия [Yekaterinburg: Encyclopedia] (in Russian). Екатеринбург: Издательство Уральского университета. entry 771. ISBN 978-5-7996-3673-9.
- Chernoukhov, A. V. (2000). "Екатеринбургский монетный двор" [Yekaterinburg Mint] (PDF). Уральская историческая энциклопедия [Ural Historical Encyclopedia] (in Russian). Екатеринбург: Издательство Академкнига; УрО РАН. pp. 195–196. ISBN 5-93472-019-8.
- Знаменательные и памятные даты Свердловской области : 2020 : Календарь-справочник [Memorable Dates of Sverdlovsk Oblast] (in Russian). Yekaterinburg: ИПП «Уральский рабочий». 2019. p. 208. ISBN 978-5-85383-767-6.
- Zvagelskaya, V. E. (2007). Памятники истории и культуры Свердловской области [Historical and Cultural Landmarks of the Sverdlovsk Region] (in Russian). Vol. 1. ИПП «Уральский рабочий». p. 208. ISBN 978-5-85383-767-6.
- Zvagelskaya, V. E. (1887). "Сенатский указ № 11957 — 28 октября 1763 года" [Senate Decree No. 11957 — 28 October 1763]. In Demmeni, M. (ed.). Сборник указов по монетному и медальному делу в России [Compendium of Historical and Cultural Monuments of the Sverdlovsk Region] (in Russian). Saint Petersburg: A. M. Wolf Typo-Lithography. pp. 12–13.
- Korepanov, N. S. (2017). Энциклопедия Екатеринбурга: в 3 т. [Encyclopedia of Yekaterinburg: in 3 vols.] (in Russian). Vol. V. 1. 1723–1807: Birth and Development. Екатеринбург: ООО «Туристско-информационный центр Екатеринбурга». p. 184.
- Korepanov, N. S. (2018). Энциклопедия Екатеринбурга: в 3 т. [Encyclopedia of Yekaterinburg: in 3 vols.] (in Russian). Vol. V. 2. 1807–1917: a mining town, county seat. Екатеринбург: ООО «Туристско-информационный центр Екатеринбурга». p. 184.
- Alekseyev; Gavrilov (2008). Металлургия Урала с древнейших времён до наших дней [Metallurgy in the Urals from Ancient Times to the Present] (in Russian). М.: Наука.
- Borisenko, P. (2023). "На улицах Екатеринбурга появились новые люки в виде монет" [Coin-shaped manhole covers have appeared on the streets of Yekaterinburg]. nakanune.ru (in Russian). Nakanune.RU News Agency.
- German, I. F. (1809). "Екатеринбургский монетный двор". Екатеринбургский монетный двор // Описание заводов, под ведомством Екатеринбургского горного начальства состоявших [The Yekaterinburg Mint // Description of the Factories Under the Jurisdiction of the Yekaterinburg Mining Authority] (PDF) (in Russian). Типография Екатеринбургских горных заводов. pp. 98–107.
- Grigoryev, E. A.; Meshcheryakov, V. N.; Chernoukhov, A. V. (2010). Екатеринбургский монетный двор : История. Каталог. Документы [The Yekaterinburg Mint: History. Catalog. Documents] (in Russian). Yekaterinburg: Издательтво Уральского университета. p. 176. ISBN 978-5-7996-0536-0.
- Golovyeva, S. V. (2017). "Уникальная коллекция сибирской монеты в собрании Алтайского государственного краеведческого музея" [A Unique Collection of Siberian Coins in the Collection of the Altai State Museum of Local History]. Ползуновский альманах (in Russian). 4 (4). Barnaul: 111–118.
- Gubkin, O. P.; Shaydurova, G. P. (2005). Художественное литьё XIX—XX веков в собрании Екатеринбургского музея изобразительных искусств [Artistic Castings of the 19th–20th Centuries in the Collection of the Yekaterinburg Museum of Fine Arts] (in Russian). Yekaterinburg: «Автограф». p. 320. ISBN 5-98955-007-3.
- Zlokazov, L. D.; Semyonov, V. B. (2013). Екатеринбургский монетный двор : 150 лет истории [The Yekaterinburg Mint: 150 Years of History] (in Russian). Yekaterinburg: Научно-культурный фонд «Фонд Тимофеева». p. 642. ISBN 978-5-903947-07-2.
- Korepanov, N. S. (2014). Никифор Клеопин [Nikifor Kleopin] (in Russian). Yekaterinburg: Банк культурной информации. p. 288. ISBN 978-5-7851-0789-2.
- Korepanov, N. S. (2015). "Очерки истории Екатеринбургского монетного двора" [Essays on the History of the Yekaterinburg Mint]. Веси : журнал [Vesi] (10 (116)). Barnaul: Учреждение культуры «Банк культурной информации»: 8–43.
- Korepanov, N. S.; Blinov (2005). Город посередине России : Культурно-исторические очерки [A City in the Heart of Russia: Cultural and Historical Essays] (in Russian). Yekaterinburg: Издательство «Сократ». p. 368. ISBN 5-88664-236-6.
- Korepanova, S. A.; Korepanov, N. S.; Rukosuev, E. Yu. (2007). Медная монета Екатеринбурга [Copper Coinage of Yekaterinburg] (in Russian). Yekaterinburg: Artefakt. p. 144.
- Kuzhilny, D. (2020). "Знакомство с Екатеринбургом: История уральской монеты. mstrok.ru. ООО «Агентство новостей „Между строк"» (29 октября 2020)" [Getting to Know Yekaterinburg: The History of the Ural Coin] (in Russian).
- Lotaryova, R. M. (2011). Города-заводы России : XVIII — первая половина XIX века [Factory Towns of Russia: 18th Century—First Half of the 19th Century] (in Russian). Yekaterinburg: Издательство «Сократ». p. 288. ISBN 978-5-88664-372-5.
- Matveyev, A. K. (2008). Географические названия Урала : Топонимический словарь [Geographical Names of the Urals] (in Russian). Екатеринбург: Издательский дом «Сократ». p. 352. ISBN 978-5-88664-299-5.
- Neklyudov, E. G. (2020). "Попытки приватизации Екатеринбургской механической фабрики и Монетного двора..." [Attempts to Privatize the Yekaterinburg Mechanical Factory and Mint in the 1870s–1880s]. Урал индустриальный. Бакунинские чтения [Industrial Urals: Bakunin Readings] (in Russian). 1. Yekaterinburg: 298–304. ISSN 2079-1097.
- Porunova, E. (2015). "История: 280 лет назад в Екатеринбурге возобновил работу Монетный двор" [History: 280 years ago, the Mint resumed operations in Yekaterinburg] (in Russian).
- Prosnikova, O. N. (2023). Екатеринбургский монетный двор [Yekaterinburg Mint] (in Russian). СПб.: Издательский дом «ПервоГрад». p. 160. ISBN 978-5-6044340-7-9.
- Sytnikov, Yu.; Zlokazov, L. (2005). "Екатеринбургский монетный двор" [Yekaterinburg Mint].
- Uzdenikov, V. V. (1995). Объём чеканки российских монет на отечественных и зарубежных монетных дворах: 1700—1917 [Volume of Russian Coin Minting at Domestic and Foreign Mints, 1700–1917] (in Russian). Moscow: Малая Медведица. p. 168. ISBN 5-900409-06-6.
