= Coat of arms of Yekaterinburg =

Russian municipal symbol

- Adopted: 23 May 2008
- Crest: Crown with laurel wreath
- Shield: Party per fess vert and or; on a mine shaft argent in first quarter and furnace argent in second quarter with an azure fess cossitted and wavy spanning the width of the lower field
- Supporters: A gold bear on the left and a gold sable on the right
- Compartment: A gold ribbon

The coat of arms of Yekaterinburg (Russian: Герб Екатеринбурга) is the official municipal coat of arms of Yekaterinburg, Russia. The current symbol was adopted on 23 May 2008 and consists of a French shield divided horizontally into two fields, with a white mine shaft and a white furnace within the top field, which is green, and a blue wavy bend within the bottom field, which is gold. A gold bear and gold sable are located to the left and right of the shield, respectively. A gold crown with a gold laurel wreath is located above the shield and a gold ribbon is located below the shield. A grey druse is located at the bottom center of the shield.

Various other versions of the coat of arms have been adopted throughout the city's history, with the first being adopted in 1783. The coat of arms changed in 1973, while the city was named Sverdlovsk. It changed again in 1998 and was a simplified version of its current arms.

== Design and symbolism ==
The shield's fortress design symbolizes the fortified walls that surrounded the city in its early history. The crown's design was made to resemble five towers, further symbolizing the historical walls. The wavy blue line symbolizes the Iset, which runs through the city. The bear symbolizes Europe and the sable symbolizes Asia, as Yekaterinburg is on the border of the two continents. The sable also is a traditional symbol for Ural metal. The animals' facial expressions show aggression, as they symbolize protection of the city. The bottom ribbon symbolizes the city's position as a de facto capital city of the Ural region, as well as its position as an important economic center for the region. The furnace and mine shaft symbolize the metallurgic and mining industry in the city, respectively. Green was used because it is the traditional territorial color of the Urals and the border between the gold and green symbolises the border of Europe and Asia. The druse symbolizes the scientific importance of the city and surrounding region, as well as the mineral wealth of the region.

== History ==
=== Non-official symbols ===
The first symbols of Yekaterinburg were the seals of various factories within the city.

=== First coat of arms (1783–1973) ===
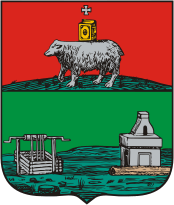
Yekaterinburg's official coat of arms from 1783 to 1973 (left) and Bernhard Karl von Koehne's proposed 1862 design (right)

The first coat of arms of Yekaterinburg was approved by Catherine II on 17 July 1783. The design featured elements from the coat of arms of Perm Krai in its top half, copying its red field and the grey bear with a yellow Bible on its back and a silver eight-pointed star above. The bottom features a green field with a silver mine shaft and furnace. This design was consistent with the thirteen other arms of municipalities in Perm Krai that were approved at that time. The same color scheme as the other cities was used and the traditional design of splitting the shield in half was also used.

The design is attributed to Prince Mikhail Shcherbatov, who served as the Russian Master-of-Heraldry from 1871 until 1877.

Bernhard Karl von Koehne created a draft for the city's coat of arms in 1862, which was never approved. The design featured a silver shield with a black smoking furnace as the primary element. The bottom of the shield featured two black rows with yellow bell designs and the canton featured the same bear and Bible featured on the city's coat of arms. Crossing gold pickaxes were featured in the background of the arms and a red ribbon was draped over both pickaxes. A grey crown is located above the shield. Koehne made many designs for Russian city coat of arms, which were to be implemented gradually, but due to the death of Alexander II, a leading supporter, and the imminent death of Koehne, many of his designs went unused, including his Yekaterinburg design.

=== Second coat of arms (1973–1991) ===
Sverdlovsk's coat of arms from 1973 to 1998

Uralsky Sledopyt, a regional magazine, published a draft of a new city emblem in 1960. It featured a Spanish shield with a black monument to Yakov Sverdlov, the new namesake of the city of Sverdlovsk, which Yekaterinburg was renamed to in 1924 by the ruling Bolsheviks. The monument was aligned to the left and was against a background of grey clouds and red flashes of fire. The name of the city was written in the crest and the Flag of the Russian Soviet Federative Socialist Republic was featured above that. This may have been the first sign that the city emblem would change, due to Soviet control.

In January 1967, a coat of arms competition was announced for the 245th anniversary of the city. 45 submissions were received and the results were received in July. A second round for the competition was announced, but it was replaced by a contest between authors of the newspaper Vecherny Sverdlovsk and V.A. Frolov, the city's chief artist. The winning design consisted of a red shield divided into quarters. A lyre, bowl with a flame, silhouette of a plant, and a mine gate were each featured in their own quarter. A gold star was featured on the top and a ribbon was at the bottom that read "1723". The arms were supposed to symbolize culture, science, industry, and the Soviets. It was also supposed to resemble the 1783 coat of arms. The design was never approved, due to negative public approval of the project.

For the 250th anniversary of the city in 1972, a subgroup of artists and architects worked to create a new coat of arms, and it was approved by the city duma on June 13, 1973. The design consisted of a silver shield with a red silhouette of the perimeter of Yekaterinburg plant, with a black or gold gear in the center and a blue pillar running the height of the shield. A blue atom diagram on a white background was featured at the top of the blue strip with five white strips running from the top to the meeting of the strip with the gear. A gold lizard was to the left of the shield and a gold sable was on the right. A few modifications were made to this design before it was approved. The authors were listed as G.I. Dubrovin, A.V. Ovechkin, and M. Fattakhuddinov. On September 10, 1991, probably due to the looming dissolution of the Soviet Union, the city restored the former coat of arms. The lizard symbolized the stories of Pavel Bazhov and the sable represented the Demidov metal factories.

=== Third coat of arms (1998–2008) ===
Yekaterinburg's coat of arms from 1998 to 2008

A competition was formed in 1994 to create the new coat of arms of the city of Yekaterinburg. One submission, from R.M. Budnik and V.V. Tipikin from the "Evening Yekaterinburg" newspaper, featured a red field with golden outline of the fortress, with an eight-spoked silver wheel in the center of it. The shield is topped with a five-headed golden crown. A golden hammer and an axe are in the background, both draped with a blue ribbon. The red represented bravery, the gold wealth, justice, and generosity, the silver unity, and the blue beauty and greatness. The wheel symbolized Saint Catherine, the namesake of the city. The hammer represents industry and the axe represents the defense of Russia. This design, with a few modifications, was presented as a draft for the coat of arms of Sverdlovsk Oblast.

The official coat of arms was adopted by the city duma on 23 July 1998. The design was a horizontally-divided green and gold shield, with a silver mine shaft and a furnace with a red fire inside at the top field, and a blue wavy belt, bordered in silver. A gold bear and sable, with red tongues and collars of black and gold squirrel fur, stand to the left and right of the shield, respectively.

=== Fourth coat of arms (2008–present) ===
The fourth coat of arms was very similar to the former coat of arms. A few modifications were made, like the addition of a crown above the shield. It was approved on 23 May 2008.
