= Catherine's Cathedral, Yekaterinburg =

Former Orthodox cathedral in Russia

- Monastery of the Theotokos of Iveron
- Екатерининский собор
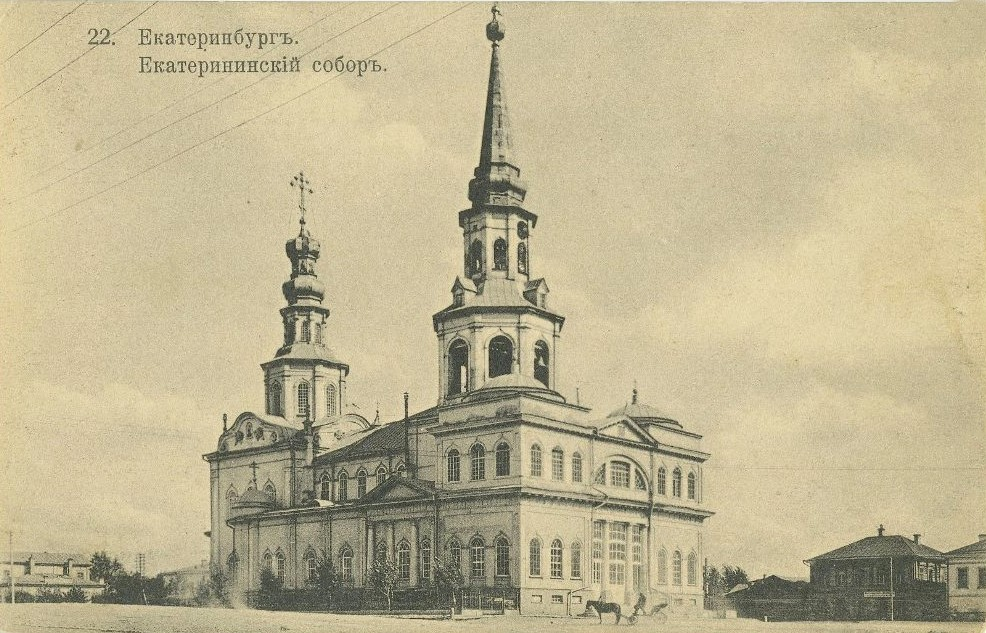
- Catherine's Cathedral, Yekaterinburg
- 56.5018°N 60.3624°E
- Location: Yekaterinburg
- Country: Russia
- Denomination: Orthodox Christian church

History
- Founded: 1723

Architecture
- Functional status: Inactive
- Architect(s): Kremlev I. T., G. A. and I. A. Tatarinov brothers
- Style: Russian Baroque
- Years built: 1758-1764
- Demolished: 1930

The Catherine Cathedral (also known as the Catherine Mining Cathedral or Cathedral of Saint Great Martyr Catherine; in Russian Екатерининский собор) was a former Orthodox church in Yekaterinburg, initially built as an adobe church during the founding of the fortress and plant in 1723. After a fire in 1747 destroyed the building, a stone church was founded in 1758 and consecrated in 1768. The church's primary relic was a portion of the relics of Saint Simeon of Verkhoturye, brought to Yekaterinburg in the late 1820s.

The cathedral, managed by the Ural Mining Administration, was located in the city center on the elevated left bank of the Iset River, east of the Epiphany Cathedral built in 1747, at the intersection of Lenin Avenue and Pushkin Street. The nearby square was named after it. The Epiphany and Catherine cathedrals were the dominant heights in the city center, shaping the focal points of Lenin Avenue and the dam.

In February 1930, the cathedral was closed, and in early April, it was demolished by the decision of the Sverdlovsk City Executive Committee. Bricks salvaged from the ruins were used as building materials for public buildings in the city.

On August 18, 1991, a memorial cross was erected at the site of the cathedral's altar, and in 1998, to mark Yekaterinburg's 275th anniversary, the Chapel of Saint Catherine was built nearby. In 2019, discussions about reviving and rebuilding the Cathedral of Saint Catherine sparked significant public reaction, leading to a series of protests and rallies against construction in the park on Oktyabrskaya Square.

== Construction history ==
=== Adobe church ===
On February 27, 1726, Archimandrite Philipp of the Tobolsk Znamensky Monastery consecrated the church. (Note: The archimandrite's name varies in sources; sometimes Gennady is mentioned .) It was covered with a wood shingle roof, with the bell tower spire and dome clad in white tin. The first bells were cast by a Demidov master, the iconostasis was crafted by local Yekaterinburg artisans, and vestments and books were purchased in Tobolsk. The first priest was the widowed archpriest Theodosius Vasiliev, previously serving at the Nevyan Plant; his sons Ivan and Kuzma formed the clergy—Ivan as a deacon and Kuzma as a sexton. The first church warden was local resident Mikhail Suzdaltsev. As the new church lacked many essentials, Gennin appealed to the empress for aid. This request was answered promptly, with necessary church "vestments" sent from St. Petersburg via courier: vestments of brocade (white floral patterns on a crimson base) with gold braid, lined with red Chinese silk; a matching sticharion, epitrachelion, maniple, and aer; a phelonion of double-sided taffeta silk in yellow and red, hemmed with red ribbon and lined with azure Chinese silk, etc. Additionally, silver church utensils and liturgical books were sent from Moscow.

— I. I. Simanov, 1889

On October 1, 1723, in the under-construction plant-fortress, priest Ivan Efimov from the Tobolsk regiment consecrated the foundation of the first adobe church. During construction, residents of the plant settlement were assigned to the parish of the Transfiguration Church at the nearby Uktus Plant. Major works were completed by late summer 1724, and on August 30, the first commander of the Yekaterinburg Plant, F. E. Neklyudov, reported to W. I. de Hennin about the church's construction, noting that the crowning cross was still being made at the Uktus Plant. With the blessing of Catherine I, the future plant was named Yekaterinburg, so the first church was decided to be consecrated in the name of Saint Great Martyr Catherine, the patron saint of the empress, after whom the emerging Yekaterinburg was named. (Note: Екатерининский собор // Приходы и церкви Екатеринбургской епархии : Исторический очерк [St. Catherine Cathedral // Parishes and churches of Yekaterinburg diocese : Historical sketch] (in Russian). Екатеринбург: Братство св. праведного Симеона Верхотурского Чудотворца, типография Ф. К. Хомутова. 1902. P. 6.)

The new church was built using fachwerk technique, popularized in Yekaterinburg by European craftsmen working on the plant and settlement. The structure featured a log frame with spaces between logs filled with bricks and clay. It had 24 mica windows, a wooden floor, and was heated by three brick stoves. The elevated part was an octagon, the roof was covered with white tin, and it was topped with a dome and a small bell tower with a spire. The bell tower had nine copper bells weighing from one to forty poods.

After construction, the Catherine Church remained unconsecrated for a year due to a lack of funds for maintaining the clergy. On January 2, 1726, de Hennin reluctantly appealed to the Cabinet of Her Imperial Majesty to task the Tobolsk metropolitan with consecrating the church and organizing the parish. Simultaneously, without awaiting the empress's response, he made a similar request directly to Metropolitan of Tobolsk and Siberia Antony, who on February 22 sent Archimandrite Gennady from the Znamensky Monastery to Yekaterinburg to consecrate the new church. The consecration ceremony took place on February 27, 1726, with an 11-cannon salute. In July of that year, vestments, church utensils, and books donated by the empress arrived in Yekaterinburg. Yekaterinburg Plant craftsmen created copper chandeliers for 36 candles, five tin candlesticks, and 11 copper lamps for the interior. At de Hennin's request, carver Fyodor Okhlypin, formerly with the Stroganovs, arrived in Yekaterinburg on state salary to work on the altar, and icon painter Stepan Leontiev from the Pyskorsky Transfiguration Monastery crafted the iconostasis.

To mark the consecration, efforts were made to install a clock in the bell tower's tent, ordered by de Hennin to regulate plant operations. The clock was made at the Kamensky Iron Foundry, but arrived late in Yekaterinburg. After installation, the mechanism quickly failed, so in 1728, a new clock was made and assembled at the Yekaterinburg Plant, though it too was unreliable. In May 1729, local plant blacksmiths repaired and maintained the mechanism, continuing to oversee its operation.

In 1733, after approval from the Governing Senate, de Hennin began constructing a new stone church in Yekaterinburg. However, V. N. Tatishchev, who replaced de Hennin as head of the Ural Mining Administration in 1734, ordered the structures dismantled, dissatisfied with both the church design and the chosen site.

On September 26, 1747, the old church was destroyed by fire, with only some church utensils saved. A joint investigation by Yekaterinburg police and the Tobolsk consistory identified a hot coal left in the altar furnace as the primary cause. The commission estimated the damage at 116 rubles and 10 kopecks. The sexton G. Patrushev, responsible for fire safety, was deemed primarily culpable and severely punished in October 1748. After the fire, the church's land was temporarily used as a cemetery, and the Catherine parish was closed until late 1763.

=== Stone church ===
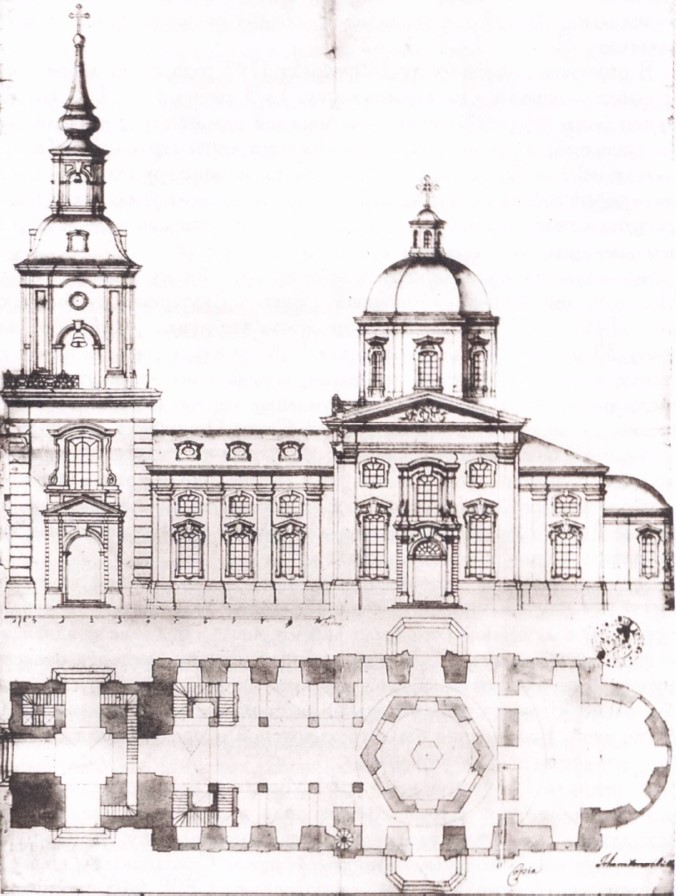
Initial draft of the cathedral (1743)

Before the old church's demolition, the Mining Administration commissioned a new stone cathedral design from Saint Petersburg architect Johann Werner Müller. His 1743 design in the Western European Baroque style envisioned a three-altar church with a three-tiered square bell tower and a hexagonal dome over the central section. Müller placed the side altars within the central nave, unlike the standard Russian church architecture of the time, which typically added side altars as separate volumes.

On January 15, 1746, a construction estimate was sent to the Berg-Kollegium for approval. After lengthy discussions, on July 24, 1747, the board's president A. F. Tomilov submitted a report to Elizabeth Petrovna, detailing the history of the first Catherine Church and requesting an additional 3,000 rubles from the plant's treasury, beyond the 2,000 rubles approved by the Senate. On August 24, 1747, Yekaterinburg authorities received a message from the Berg-Kollegium stating that the stone church construction issue was under review and postponed indefinitely.

Over time, the need for a new church grew urgent. By 1756, Yekaterinburg's population reached 5,726, including 5,074 Orthodox Christians. The Epiphany Church, built in 1747, was relatively small, accommodating less than half the parishioners during festive services, forcing others to stand outside or attend the Uktus Plant church. A fundraising campaign among residents collected over 2,000 rubles by the start of construction.

Construction required approval from the Tobolsk Consistory. Deacon Mikhail Florovsky from the Epiphany Church traveled to Tobolsk to obtain the charter. In the absence of a bishop, Tobolsk could not issue permission and forwarded the request to the Holy Synod. The Synod's approval was received on December 23, 1757, and the new church's foundation was laid by archpriest Fyodor Kochnev on August 16, 1758. Müller's original design was significantly altered during construction by the chief surveyor of the Mining Office Athanasius Ivanovich Kichigin. The revised plan, approved by the Berg-Kollegium, placed side altars in separate extensions, barely connected to the central altar. As a result, the main altar became a "cold" church, used only from May to October, while the side altars were "warm," allowing year-round services. The church's volume was significantly larger than the original design.

Initially, the construction contract was planned for local Yekaterinburg masons and brothers Grigory and Ivan Antipievich Tatarinov, experienced masons from Solikamsk, a major supplier of construction labor in the 18th century. However, on June 1, 1759, work began with teams from Yaroslavl led by I. Ya. Dubov, who offered a lower cost. In November, mine surveyor I. Kuznetsov, inspecting the work, identified significant deviations from the design drawings. Measurements showed the altar was 1 arshin 2 vershoks wider and 1 arshin and ¼ vershok longer, and the church was ¾ arshin longer overall. The contract with Dubov was terminated, and after additional bidding in December, the contract to fix the issues and complete the church was awarded to the Tatarinov brothers, as no others applied. Later, Solikamsk master Jonah Timofeevich Kremlin joined them. The new contractors were given greater autonomy and the right to hire workers at their discretion.

The church was built with state funds and parishioner donations. In summer, up to 250 workers were employed; in winter, about 40. The main workforce consisted of prisoners paid daily wages, while local residents handled material transport.

On July 22, 1763, with the blessing of Tobolsk and Siberian Metropolitan Pavel, Archpriest Kochnev consecrated the northern altar in the name of Archdeacon Stephen, and on September 23, 1763, the southern altar in the name of John the Theologian. (Note: According to other sources, the southern side chapel was consecrated on September 25, 1763, and the northern one on July 22, 1764 in the name of Simeon of Verkhotursk.) In October 1764, the completed altar in the name of Dmitry of Rostov was consecrated. During this time, the church was still being finished, and its interior was being decorated.

On December 21, 1767, Metropolitan Pavel signed a charter blessing the new church's consecration, delivered to Yekaterinburg ten days later. However, the consecration of the Catherine Cathedral occurred on September 22, 1768, timed to coincide with the anniversary of Catherine II's coronation.

In 1809, the cathedral's clergy requested permission to expand the Dmitry altar and rename it in honor of All Saints. The Perm bishop approved, contingent on parishioner consent. Parishioners agreed, formalizing their decision in April 1810. The Perm Consistory's decree permitting construction and renaming was received on June 15, 1810. Construction began immediately, but the altar's consecration occurred in June 1834 by Yekaterinburg's first bishop Ev lampiy, in the name of the Holy Trinity.

=== Budget ===
Fundraising for construction continued until 1766, managed by the treasurers of the Mining Plants Office. From 1737 to 1763, 9,871 rubles and 33 kopecks were collected. An additional 839 rubles were raised from 1763 to 1766 to complete the project. City authorities also organized fundraising through various methods. In 1761, state scales were set up at the market square, charging traders for use, earning 234 rubles over two years for the church. By August 1, 1760, construction costs totaled 2,865 rubles, including 1,240 rubles from donations.

Casting bells required separate fundraising and materials. Fifty poods of copper were donated by Count R. Vorontsov, A. Tirchaninov. Avoluntary subscription among private plant owners for copper was announced, with only S.Yakovlev and Turchaninov responding. In 1762, two bells were cast at N. Demidov's plants for 240 rubles.

In 1765, at the initiative of A. Irman, who assumed the role of Head of the Ural Mining Administration in 1764, an audit of the Catherine Church's construction costs was conducted. Against an initial budget of 2,000 rubles, actual expenses reached 11,330 rubles, raising concerns among authorities and questions for the clergy. A material shortfall was estimated at 9,588 rubles. In May 1766, investigation results were sent to the Berg-Kollegium, which ordered a more thorough inquiry. Ultimately, the matter was dropped to focus on completing the church.

Cathedral in photographs by S. M. Prokudin-Gorsky, 1910

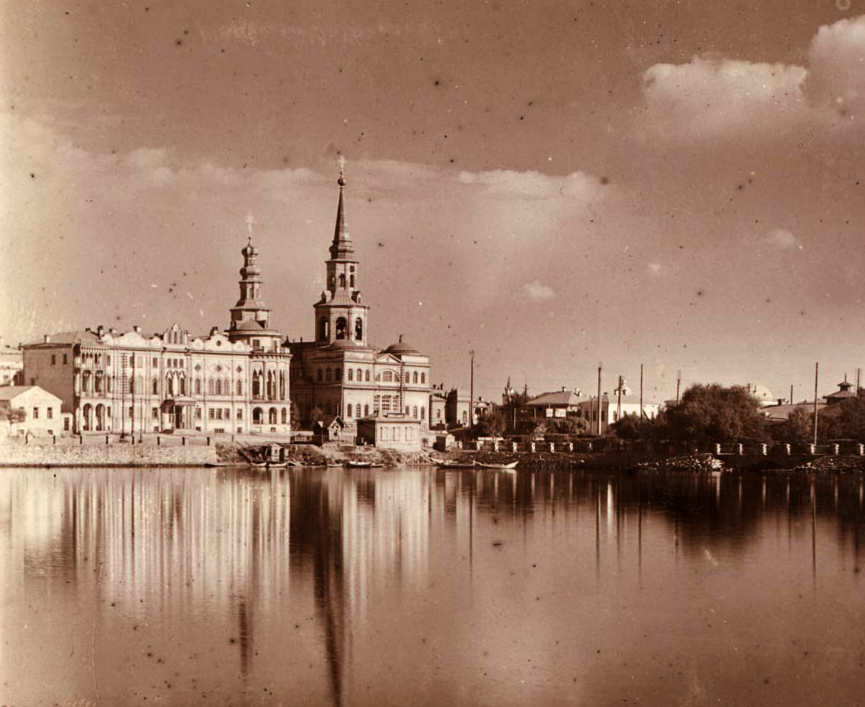
Catherine Cathedral and Sevastyanov House against the pond

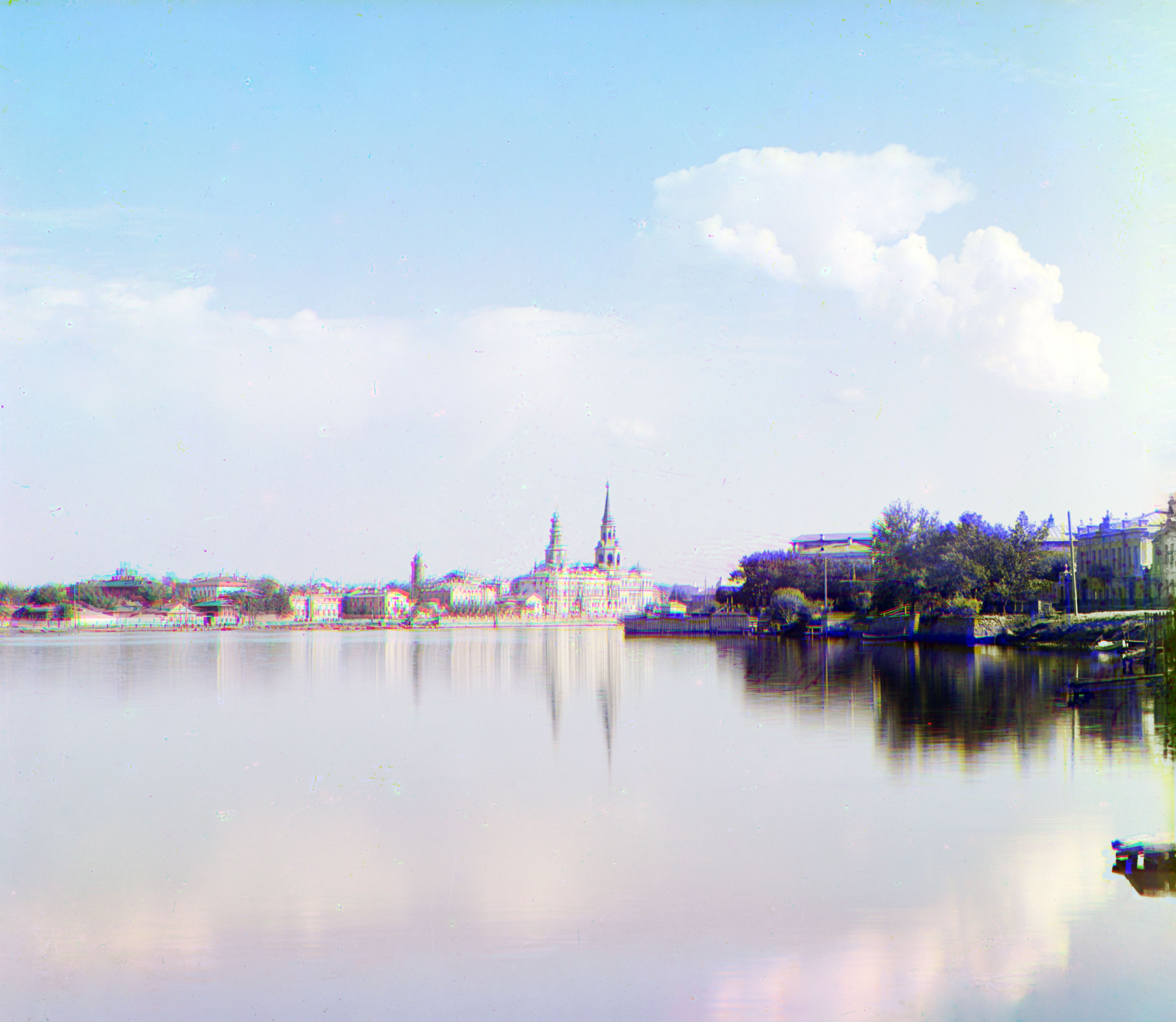
View from the pond's left bank

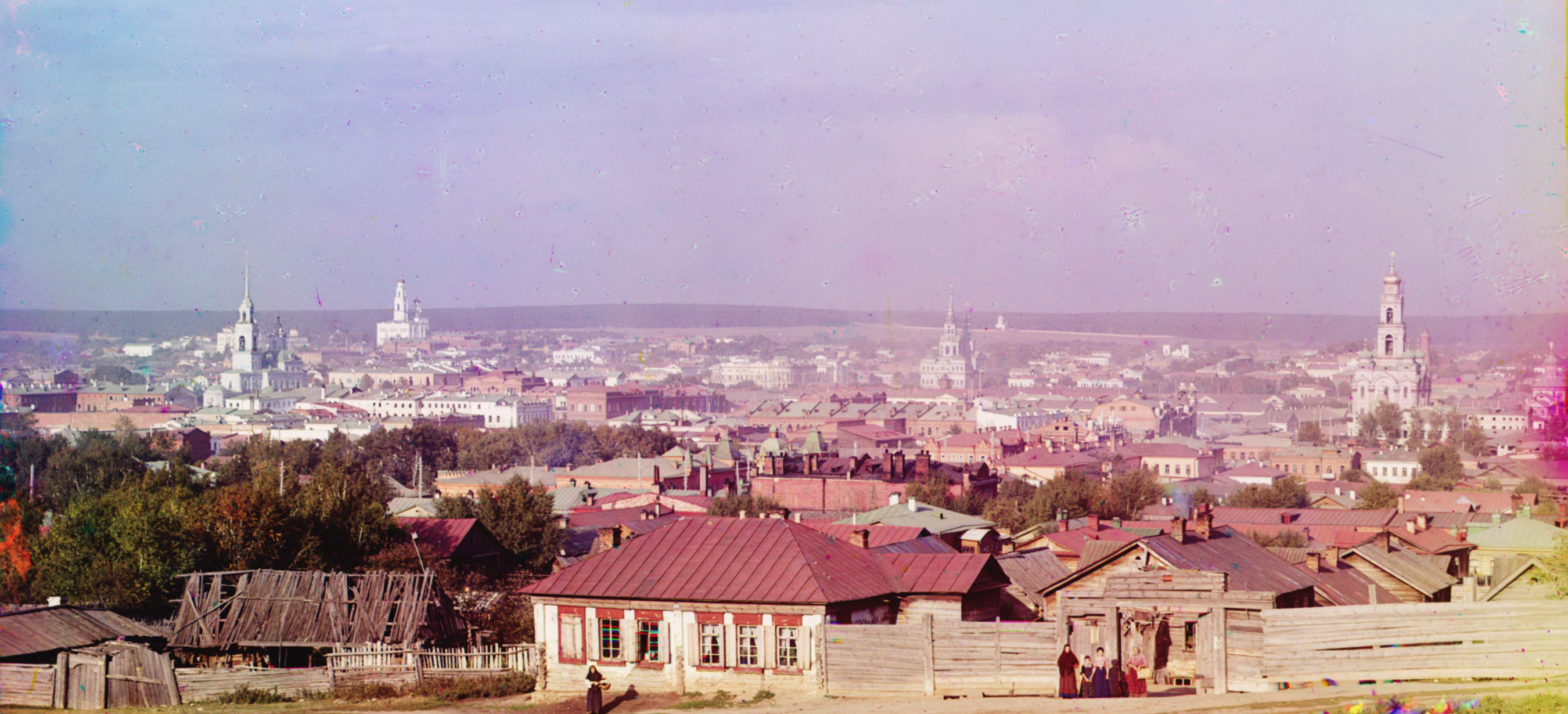
Spires of main churches (left to right): Epiphany, Ascension, Catherine, Bolshoi Zlatoust

== Clergy in the 18th–19th centuries ==
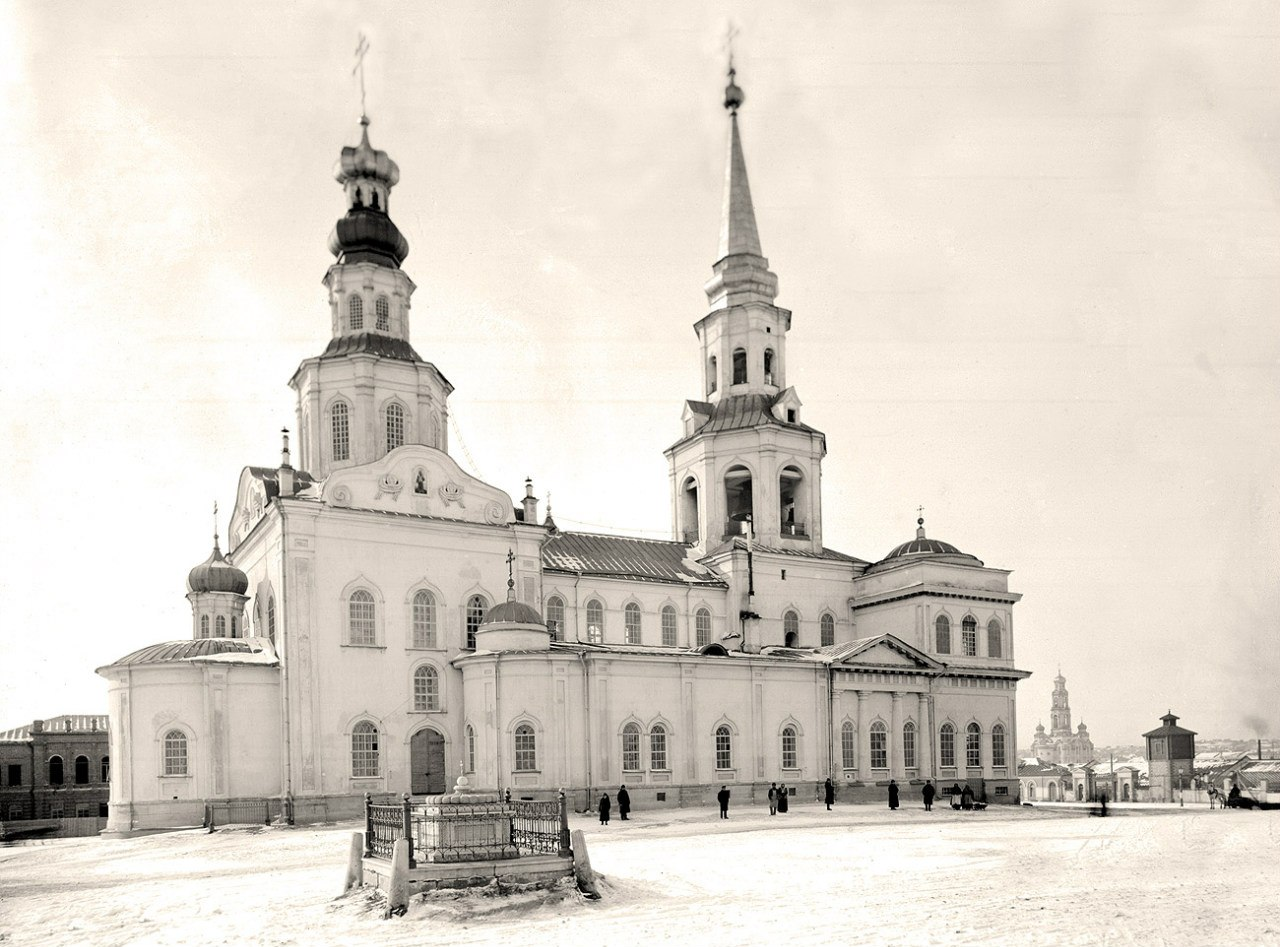
Catherine Cathedral (1880s)

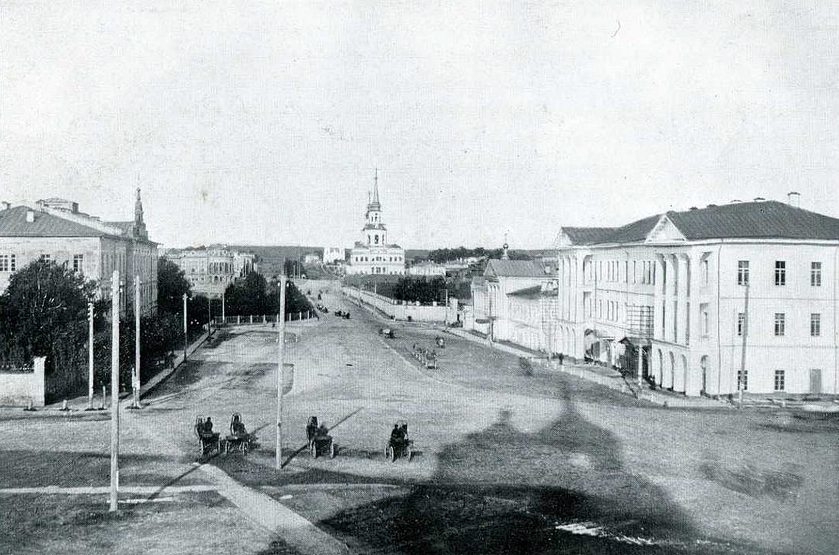
View from Epiphany Church (V. L. Metenkov, 1900)

The first rector of the Catherine Church was archpriest Theodosius Vasilievich Florovsky from the Nevyansk Plant. With his sons, deacon Ivan and sexton Kuzma, he appealed to the Siberian Ober-Bergamt in February 1726 to support his candidacy. Despite Tobolsk Metropolitan Antony appointing Fyodor Ivanov from Yalutorovsk sloboda, the decision favored Florovsky and his sons, with Ivanov sent to Gorny Shchit. Florovsky received the metropolitan's blessing charter in March 1726. In 1729, Theodosius moved to Tobolsk, and his son Ivan became rector. In May 1737, Ivan was arrested on suspicion of supporting schismatics.

In 1737, priest Yakov Nikitin from Aramil sloboda was appointed to the Catherine Church, elevated to archpriest that year. In 1741, Nikitin was transferred to Tobolsk, replaced by archpriest Vasily Kudritsky, who faced conflicts with parishioners and suspicions of embezzling church funds. In 1745, a community assembly removed Kudritsky, sending him to Tobolsk, and archpriest Iosif Afanasyev was appointed by Yekaterinburg decree. The clergy then included an archpriest, priest, deacon, two clerks, and a sexton. After the 1747 fire destroyed the Catherine Church, the clergy were transferred to the Epiphany Church.

After Afanasyev's sudden death in 1747, V. Kalinovsky became archpriest, serving both parishes. In 1750, the Yekaterinburg Spiritual Board was established, and in 1751, F. L. Kochnev was appointed head of the Yekaterinburg decree, serving until 1764 and initiating the stone Catherine Cathedral's construction. After the cathedral's revival in 1763–1764, priest A. Voinstvenskikh assisted Kochnev. Following the main cathedral's consecration, Kochnev was tonsured a monk at the Trinity Monastery in Tyumen by the Tobolsk Consistory's decision in late 1768, accused of self-governance and supporting schismatics. A. P. Voinstvenskikh then became archpriest.

In the early 1780s, the archpriest position at the Catherine Cathedral remained vacant. In 1787, F. L. Karpinsky was appointed rector, combining church duties with teaching at the Yekaterinburg Mining School. The clergy then included two priests, two deacons, two clerks, and two sextons. From 1787, A. P. Voinstvenskikh served as a priest, with I. S. Silverstov as the second priest from 1802. By the late 1870s, the staff comprised one archpriest, three priests, three deacons, and two psalmists.

The clergy actively participated in the city's cultural life. After the 1883 formation of the Yekaterinburg Diocese, a Catherine Cathedral priest joined the Yekaterinburg Spiritual Consistory. Archpriest I. A. Levitsky became the first chairman of the Diocesan Guardianship in 1886.

== Architecture and interior ==
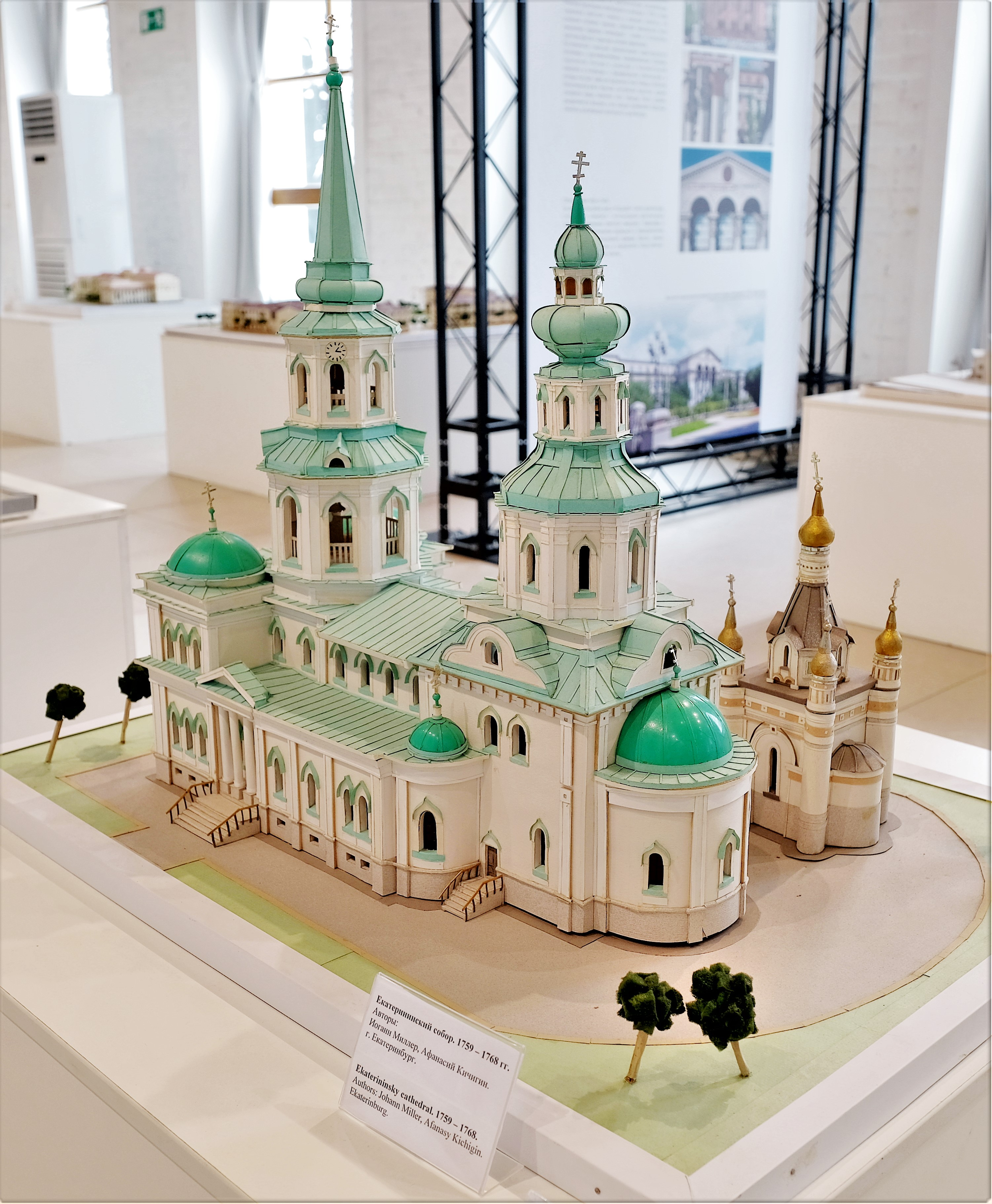
Model of the cathedral at the USAAA museum

Upon completion, the Catherine Cathedral was the city's most spacious building. Its premises covered 325 square sazhens (about 1,500 m^{2}), nearly double the size of other major churches. The building measured 55.5 meters long and 40.5 meters wide. The three-tiered bell tower, with its spire and cross, stood about 58 meters tall, the third tallest in pre-revolutionary Yekaterinburg, behind the Epiphany (Cathedral) and Maximilian Church. The bell tower had nine bells weighing 20.9 tons, with the heaviest at 13.6 tons. Designed for 8,000 people, the building was painted gray.

The initial design, adjusted by Kichigin, featured elements of Siberian Baroque. Typical of Ural Baroque churches was an elongated tripartite "ship" composition: church–refectory–bell tower, with wide side altars of independent architectural significance. The main church ended with a traditional Russian octagon on a cube composition. The Catherine Cathedral stood out with a larger lower octagon, adorned with pediments-attics with volutes. A figured tiered dome and pediments on the upper octagon added a Baroque flair.

Drawings from 1835 show side colonnades, rustication on the lower floor, and window architraves typical of Moscow Baroque. By 1854, the lower floor's rustication was gone, and window architraves had upward-pointing shapes characteristic of Byzantine architecture. From the early 19th century, the cathedral was repeatedly rebuilt, losing its original appearance. During the 1830s reconstruction led by Mikail Malakhov, side altars were extended toward the bell tower and built up to two stories. These extensions protruded beyond the original facade, housing new wide staircases to the second floor. However, they disrupted the cathedral's original elegance, making the facade bulky and disharmonious with the slender bell tower spire. Malakhov's favored classical porticos further disrupted the architectural unity. K. T. Babkin compared the cathedral's composition to the Peter and Paul Cathedral, noting the negative impact of contemporary trends on Petrine Baroque, citing "significant distortion in both details and overall masses".

Growing parishioner numbers in the early 19th century necessitated expanding the "warm" church. In 1848, an attempt to connect the side altars to the central space with three arches in the wall resulted in low, narrow openings, inconveniencing parishioners. In 1896, merging the three arches into one unified the altars into a single volume.

The Epiphany and Catherine cathedrals were the city's height dominants, shaping the focal points of Lenin Avenue and the dam against the pond and surrounding buildings. Around them formed the main city squares— Cathedral and Catherine.

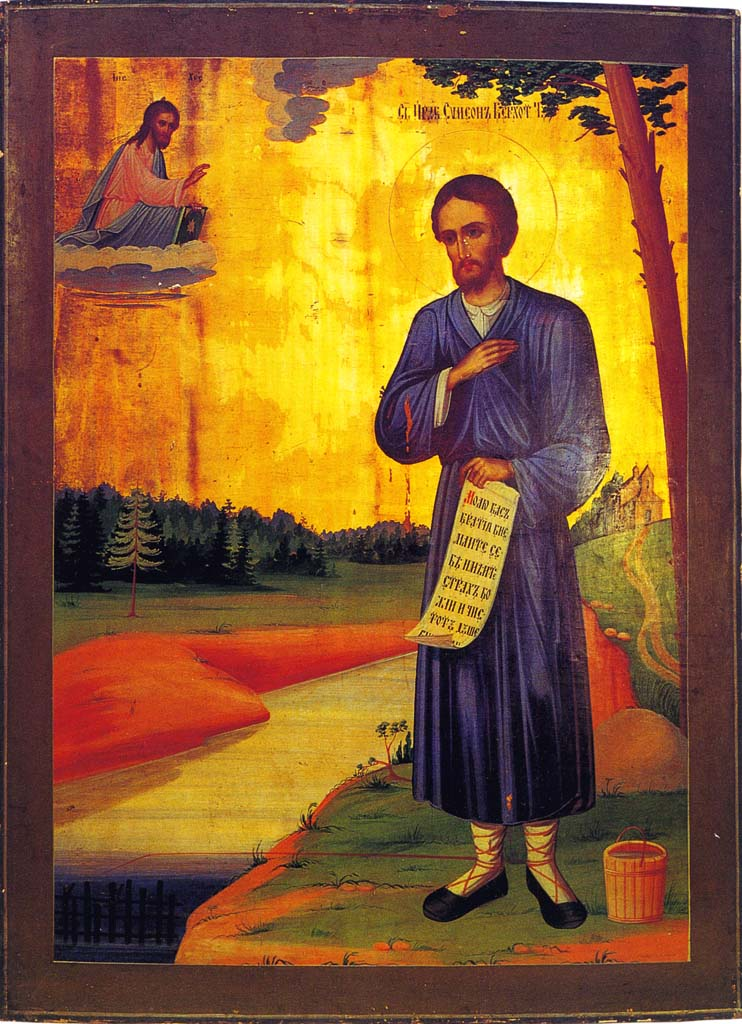
Icon Saint Simeon of Verkhoturye Praying to the Savior (1903)

The cathedral's primary relic was a portion of the relics of Saint Simeon of Verkhoturye, brought to Yekaterinburg in the late 1820s. In 1893, Yekaterinburg merchant I. F. Chistyakov donated a silver gilded reliquary (26 × 44 cm), housing an oak coffin with the relics. The reliquary was kept in the Simeon altar, in a niche beside the saint's icon.

The cathedral's interior matched its status as the main mining cathedral. The large parish enabled significant fundraising for decorations and church utensils. Parishioners often elected wealthy merchants as church wardens, who personally donated substantial sums. In the early 19th century, the cathedral's annual income was 20,000 rubles. Candle sales alone from 1809 to 1815 yielded 7,259 rubles. By the mid-19th century, funding from the Mining Department decreased significantly, and after the abolition of serfdom, which raised labor costs and reduced plant profitability, the cathedral became largely self-sustaining. Major reconstructions were funded by its own resources.

The interior walls were plastered, windows had quality glass, and floors were laid with cast iron tiles. The main church's iconostasis had nine tiers, with six festive icons in the second tier featuring silver gilded frames. The gilded iconostases of the side altars had four tiers, with John the Theologian altar icons painted on metal sheets. Festive icons in the John the Theologian and Stephen altars also had silver frames. The Holy Trinity upper church's iconostasis, painted red with gilding, was two-tiered and semicircular.

Some interior items, including those donated by Catherine I, were displayed by the cathedral clergy at the 1887 Siberian-Ural Exhibition.

The church library grew steadily, including rare and costly editions. Some books were supplied by the Tobolsk Consistory, others donated by parishioners. Before the 1747 fire, the library held 49 books, including two altar Gospels in expensive frames. In the 19th century, it added edifying works, including two anti-schismatic texts: Bishop Pitirim's Spiritual Sling (1721) and the first edition of Dmitry of Rostov's Search for the Schismatic Bryn Faith (1743). By the early 20th century, the library contained 1,237 volumes.

== Significance and cultural life ==
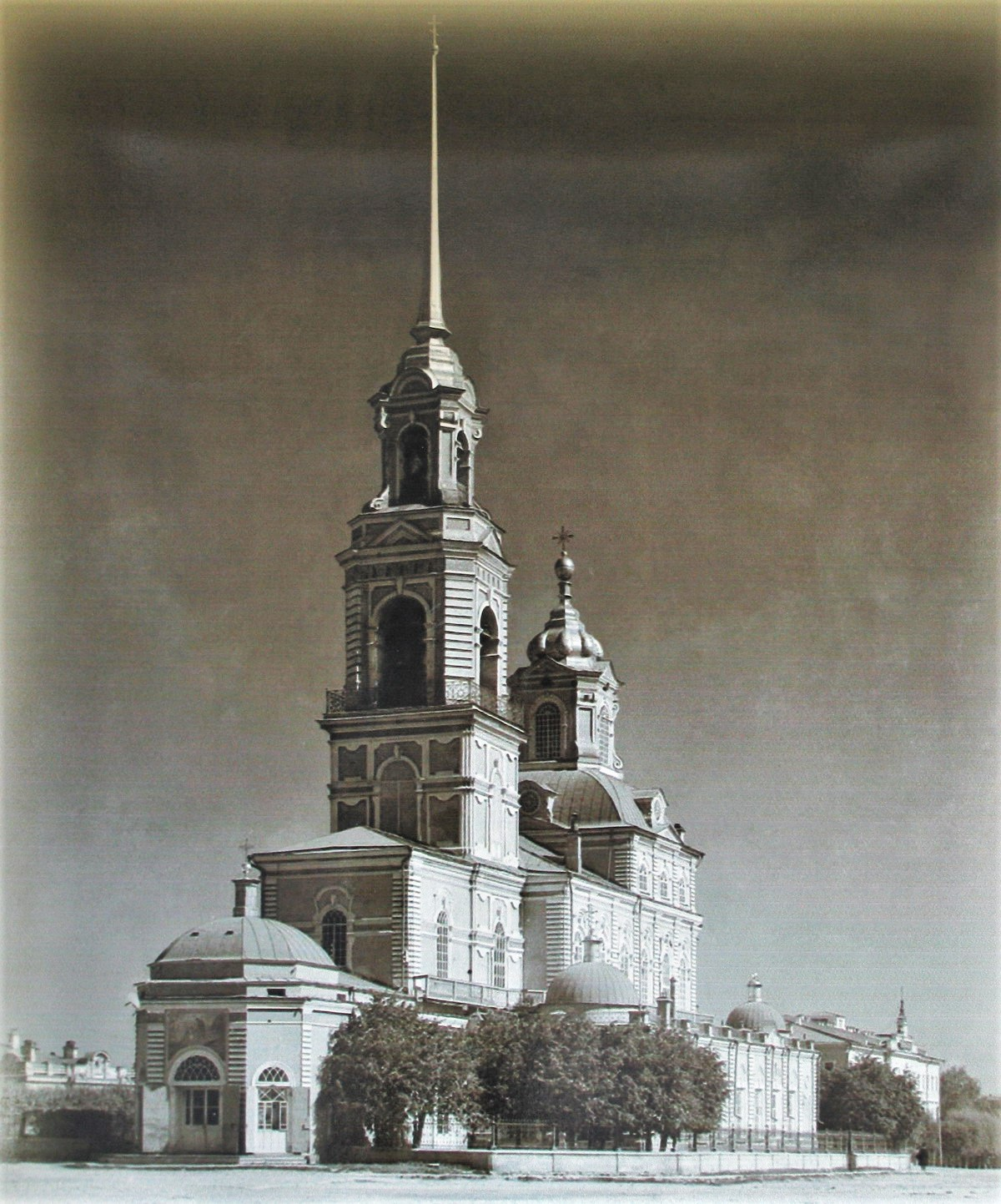
Epiphany Cathedral (1910, S. M. Prokudin-Gorsky)

Views from the cathedral’s bell tower west to east. V. L. Metenkov, 1900
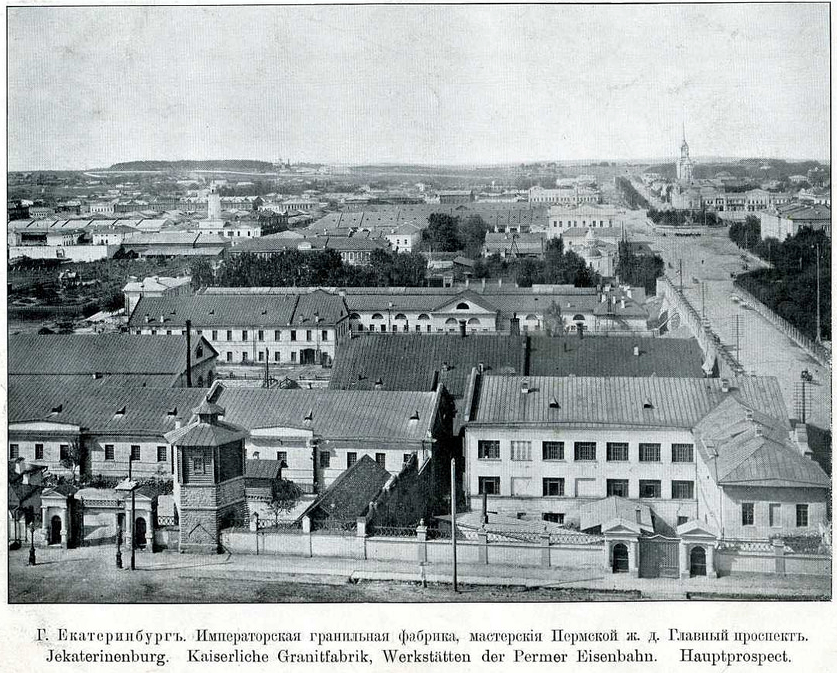
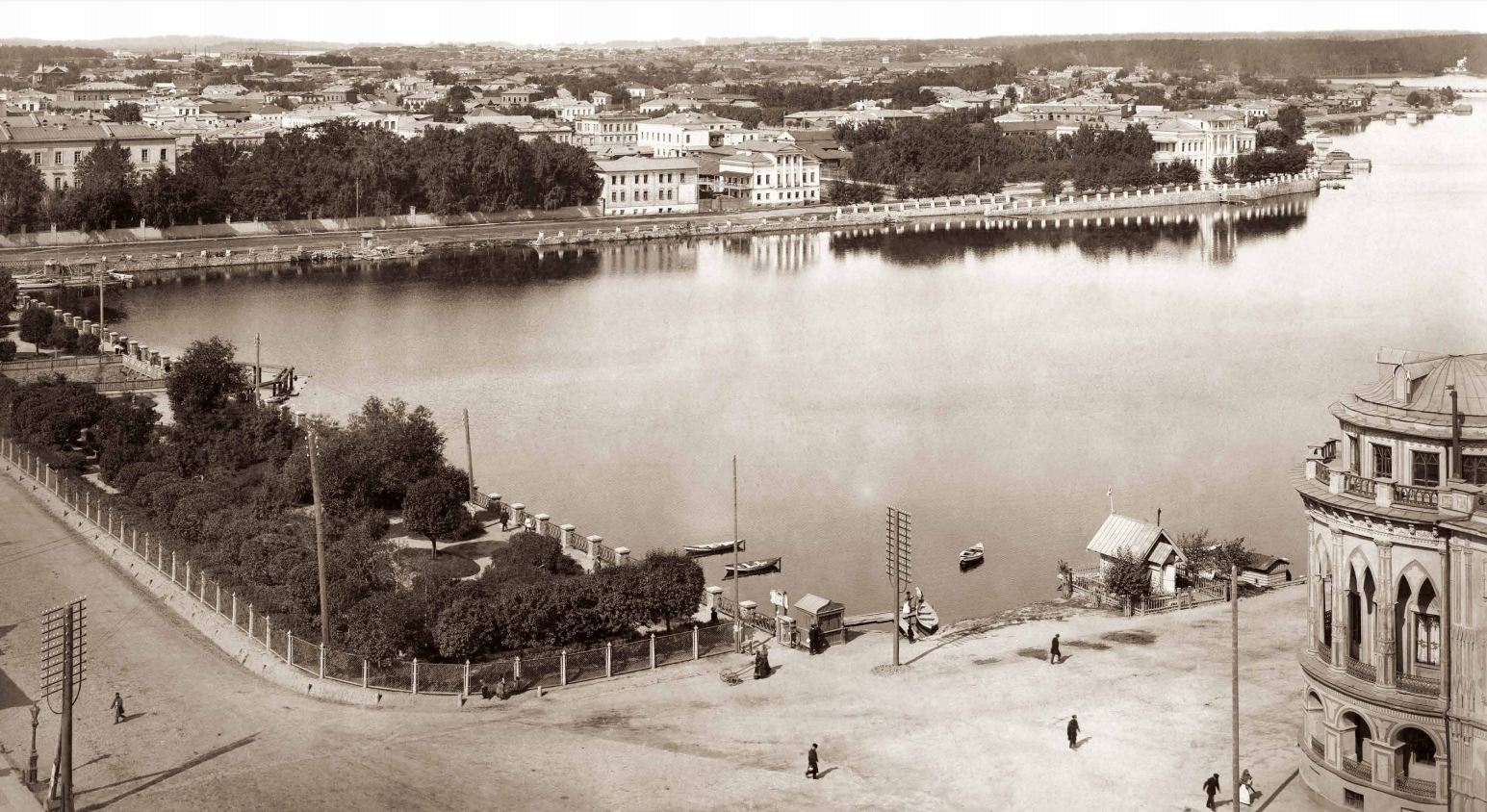
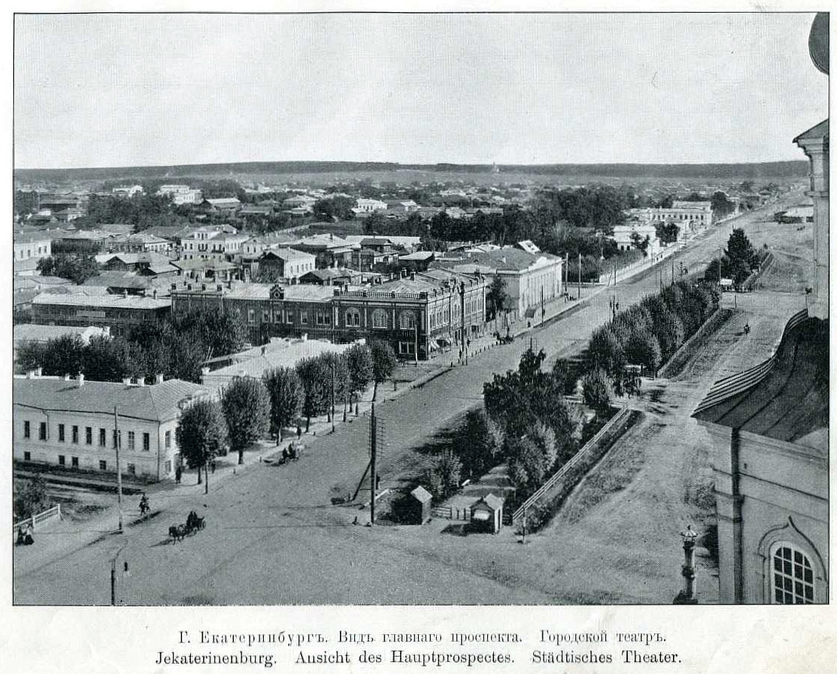
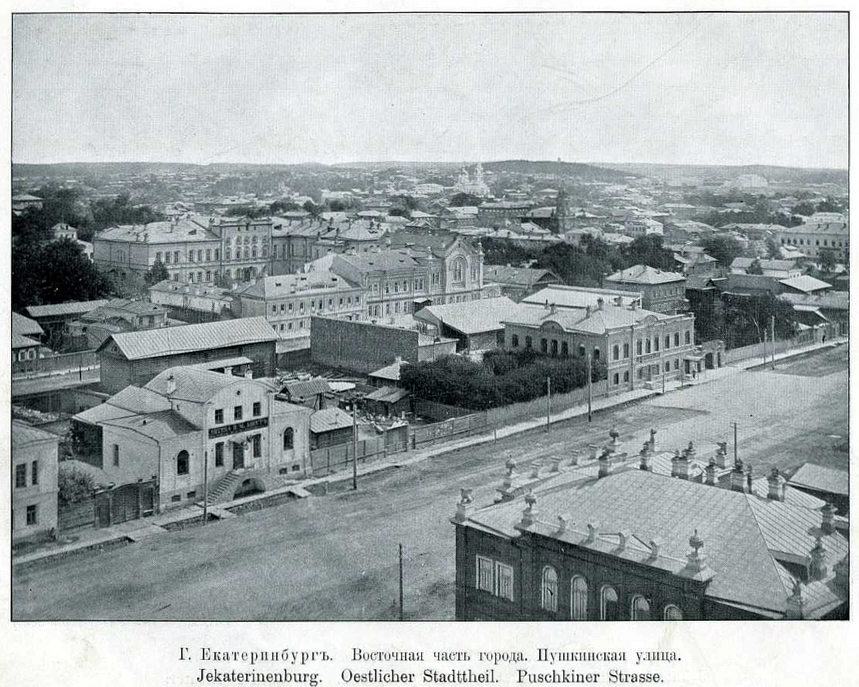

In early 1809, I. F. German, the first head of the Yekaterinburg Mining District after the mining management reform, secured Bishop Justin's approval to keep the Catherine Church under the mining administration. Thus, the Main Office of Yekaterinburg Plants retained nominal ownership, continuing to allocate funds for maintenance. From its inception, mining engineers took oaths at the cathedral, and in the 19th century, conscripted soldiers joined this tradition after the cathedral received the banner of the disbanded Ural Mining Troops. On June 28, 1869, marking the battalion's centennial, its banner was bestowed by Emperor Alexander II and stored behind the right choir of the main church.

As the cathedral was effectively owned by the Ural Mining Administration, it was often called the Catherine Mining Cathedral in official documents. Annually, on the feast day—Saint Catherine's Day—mining officers from all plants under the Yekaterinburg administration gathered at the cathedral for a solemn Divine Liturgy, followed by a fair near the church.

After the 1833 establishment of the Yekaterinburg Diocese, selecting a cathedral church was debated. The Perm Consistory concluded that the Catherine Cathedral was unsuitable due to its large parish and inconvenient location, as well as concerns over the clergy's ties to the Ural Mining Administration. The Epiphany Cathedral was chosen as the diocesan cathedral, but the Catherine Cathedral remained the most revered by residents, and Saint Catherine's Day continued as a major city holiday and non-working day until the October Revolution.

In 1806, the Catherine parish had 3,326 parishioners, mostly district court employees, Mining Board staff, post and telegraph office workers, merchants, and townspeople. By 1900, it covered the central and eastern city parts, with 4,576 parishioners, about 12% of Yekaterinburg's Orthodox and co-religionist population, making it the city's largest parish. In 1887, a parochial school opened at the cathedral, initially for boys, and from 1894, for girls. In 1894, a parochial guardianship was established to promote school education. In 1898, with the guardianship's support, mixed and girls' Simeon schools opened. The cathedral maintained a permanent church choir, with 9 men and 15 boys in 1889. As the parish included many Old Believers (425 in 1880, 260 in 1900), the Perm Consistory engaged the clergy in anti-schismatic activities, regularly requesting reports.

Beyond education, the guardianship organized charity events, funded funerals for the poor, and provided aid to the needy and pensioners in the parish. The parish was divided into sections, each overseen by a guardian to monitor aid distribution. Personal record books tracked regular aid recipients. Parochial schools received financial support from the guardianship. Donations were collected via subscription lists, direct church collections, and donation boxes in private institutions and shops.

The Catherine Cathedral played a vital social role. It hosted numerous weddings, with 1,173 marriages from 1900 to 1919. Many notable residents were married or memorialized there. Notable weddings included Englishman John Thomas Wilkinson to D. F. Ponomaryova, daughter of a collegiate secretary, in 1872, and collegiate secretary P. M. Vologodsky to A. I. Neyberg, daughter of a state councillor, in 1875. Prominent funerals included collegiate councillor V. M. Malakov, state councillors A. I. Krasnopevtsev and A. F. Chubarkov, titular councillor A. I. Sevastyanov, and women's gymnasium head E. I. Kuk. Besides the Ural Mining Battalion's banner, the cathedral housed military regalia and charters of prominent Uralians. Its enclosure contained graves of notable citizens, including M. I. Bashmakov, a key figure in suppressing the Pugachev's Rebellion, and Archimandrite Sophronius of Hilandar. At the turn of the 19th–20th centuries, one of Yekaterinburg's first electric lanterns appeared near the cathedral.

The cathedral's bell tower was a frequent photography platform. In the late 1860s, images taken there were included in the 5th volume of the album Amur, Eastern Siberia, Western Siberia, and the Urals, published in 1870. In 1895, V. L. Metenkov captured a panoramic view of Yekaterinburg from the tower. In 1900, several photos were included in his album Views of the Urals.

=== Cathedral feasts ===
Cathedral feasts included Trinity Sunday, Whit Monday, the transfer of Archdeacon Stephen's relics (August 2), Saint Simeon of Verkhoturye's memorials (September 12), and Saint Stephen's day (December 27). The main feast—Saint Great Martyr Catherine's memorial—featured a solemn moleben led by the Yekaterinburg bishop. Many parishioners, including from nearby villages, attended festive services for Saint Simeon of Verkhoturye, a major saint of the Yekaterinburg Diocese, highly revered in the Urals.

Additionally, festive services marked significant anniversaries in the History of the Russian Orthodox Church.

== Post-revolution ==
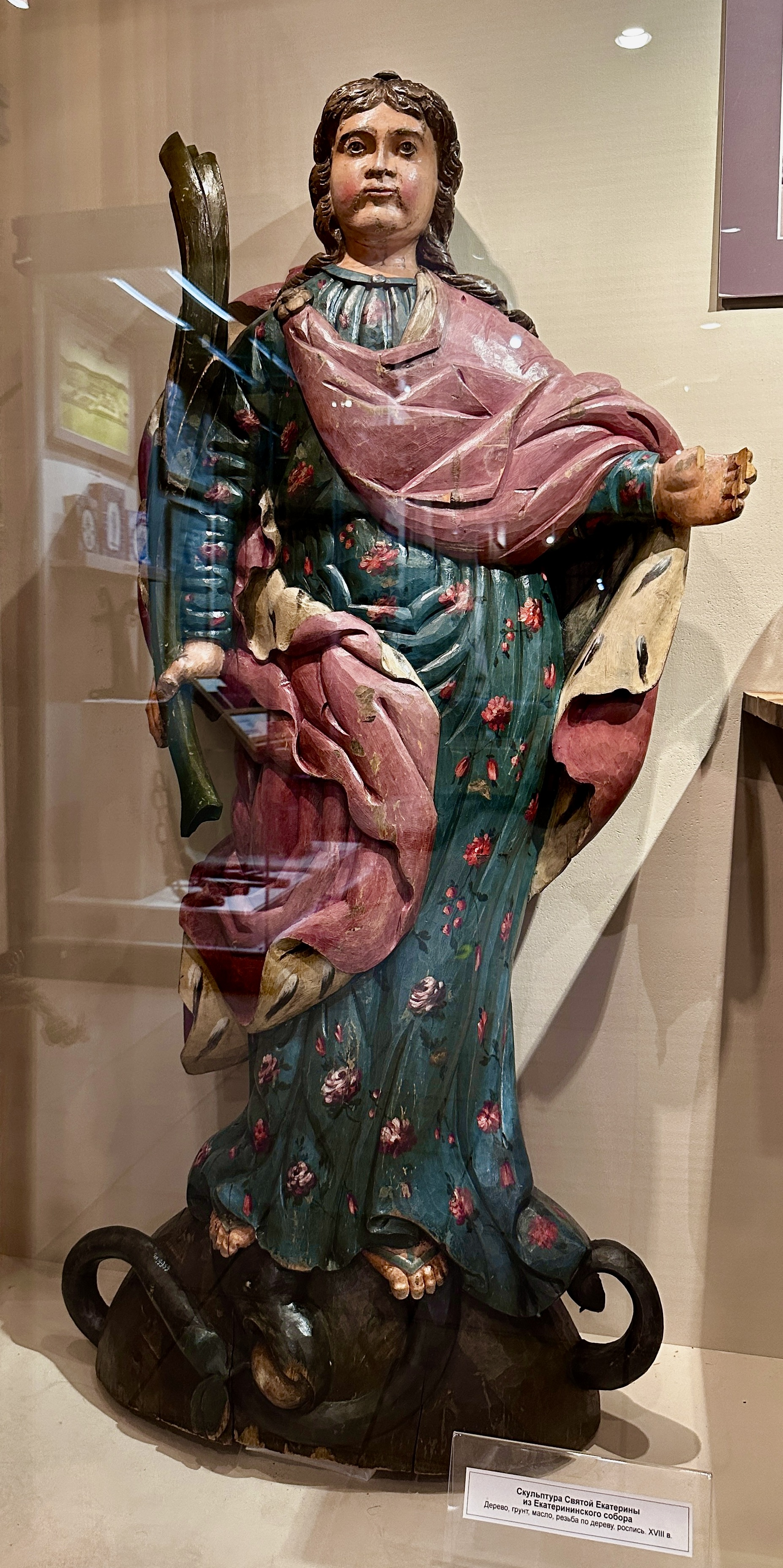
St. Catherine's statue

After the Bolsheviks' rise to power, the January 23, 1918, decree "Decree on Separation of Church from State and School from Church" effectively dismantled the church in former imperial Russia, nationalizing its property. On September 3, 1920, an agreement formed a parishioner community for the Catherine Church. By 1922, with Archpriest I. N. Ufimtsev gaining authorities' trust, all church valuables —165.6 kg of silver and numerous Ural gemstone items— were confiscated, leaving little for services. On May 10, 1922, surviving utensils, including a chalice, asterisk, diskos, and stone altar cross, displayed at the Siberian-Ural Industrial Exhibition, were transferred to M. O. Kler, president of the Ural Society of Natural Science Lovers.

In 1924, at a community council meeting chaired by V. Korzukhin, the decision was made not to support Archbishop Aristarch, sent by the Holy Synod of the Russian Orthodox Church, seen by party authorities as a rebellion and support for the disgraced Patriarch Tikhon. A commission auditing church property quickly found discrepancies, leading to the community agreement's termination. In January–February 1925, despite parishioner appeals, the Sverdlovsk District Executive Committee transferred the cathedral and remaining property to a Renovationist community led by I. Balandin, with Ufimtsev's involvement, making it their cathedral. In September 1925, Metropolitan of Sverdlovsk Korniliy (Popov) was appointed rector. A conflict later arose between Popov and Balandin over church management, leading to Balandin's removal after appeals to the district executive committee. I. N. Ufimtsev was expelled from the community, sentenced to three years of exile in 1935, and executed in 1938 after a second trial.

Lacking formal grounds to close churches, city authorities sought ways to combat communities. In 1926, Sverdlovsk League of Militant Atheists chairman Z. Zegelman liquidated the parish library as counterrevolutionary. New taxes and bans on parishioner contributions exacerbated funding issues for cathedral maintenance.

On September 23, 1920, and November 17, 1929, Simeon of Verkhoturye's relics were opened at the cathedral. After the second opening, they were transferred to the Sverdlovsk Regional Museum of Local Lore, returned to the church only in 1991, despite repeated party demands for their destruction. On January 19, 1930, the last procession to the City Pond was held from the cathedral.

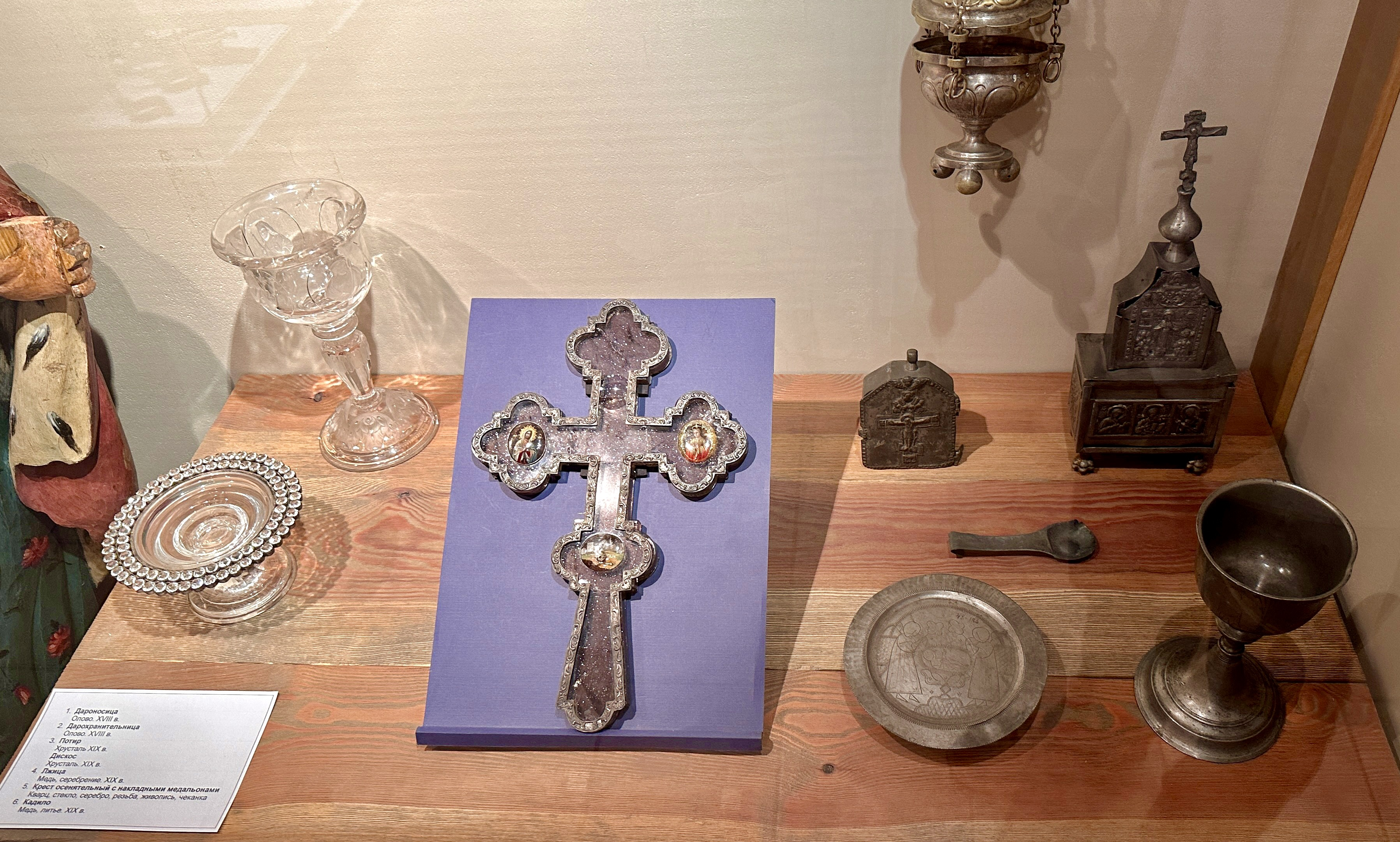
Church utensils

In early 1930, city workers' meetings discussed removing church bells for Soviet industrialization needs. On February 15, 1930, the Sverdlovsk city council decided to close the cathedral. On February 17, 1930, city executive committee chair A. N. Bychkova signed the demolition order to use its remains as building material. On March 15, city authorities received the cathedral's keys. On April 5, a church closure commission met, and the next day, the Catherine Cathedral was demolished on the third attempt by the Vzryvselprom trust. Bricks from the ruins were used for the House of Offices and House of Defense. (Note: According to other data, the bricks were broken and taken away, drowned in the swamp.)

The former Catherine Square was renamed Truda Square in the early 1920s. In 1920, a decorative Arch of Labor and a Blacksmith of Peace monument were erected before the cathedral, later removed. After demolition, a park was created, and the Gem Hill fountain, clad in jasper, marble, and chalcedony, was installed. In 1960, the fountain was rebuilt and named Stone Flower.

The architectural ensemble of the Main Post Office, former Sverdlovsk Regional Party Committee building, and Truda Square is now a Constructivist monument.

== Restoration projects ==
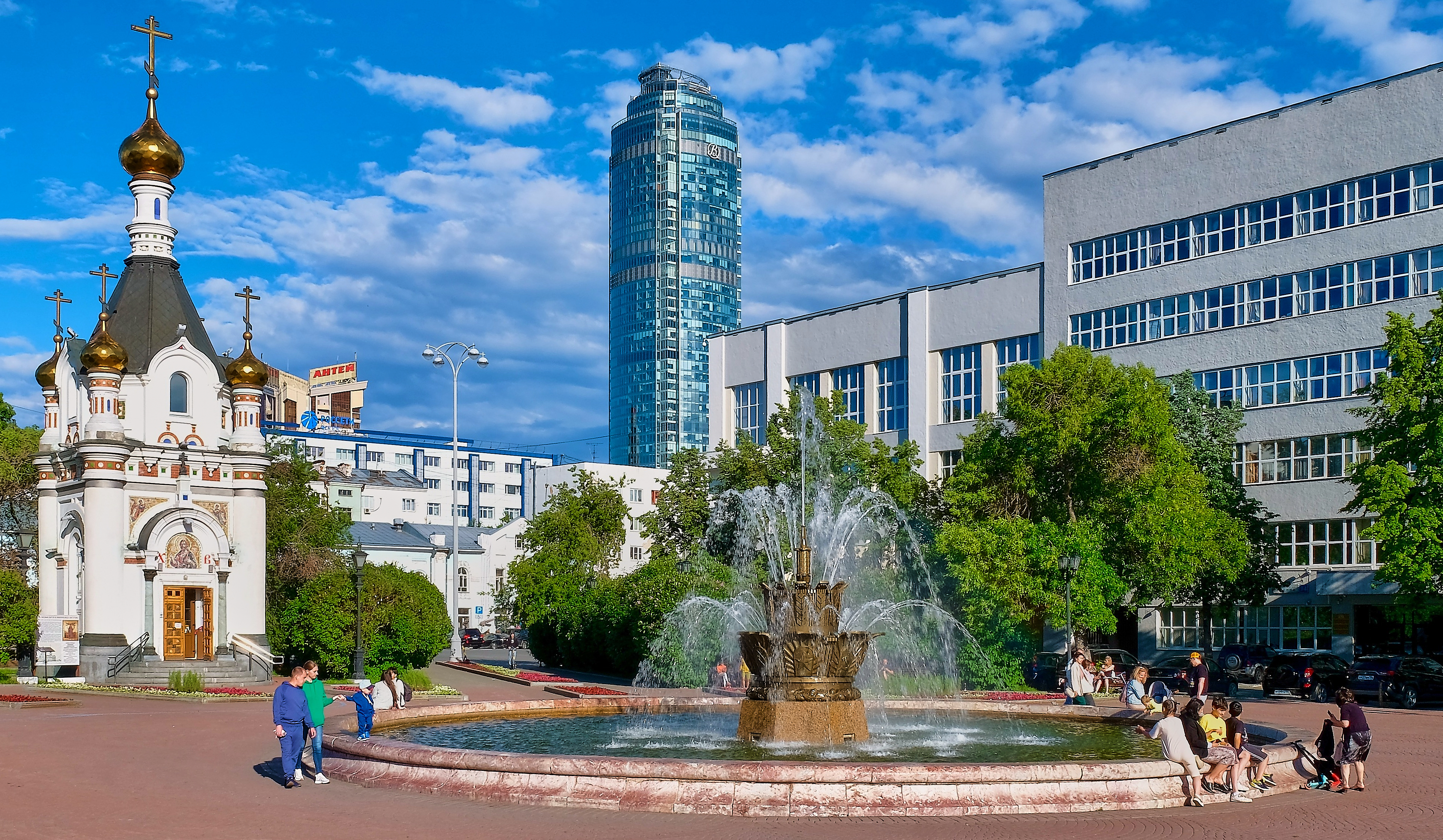
Stone Flower fountain and Chapel of Saint Catherine at Truda Square (2022)

Memorial cross and commemorative stone
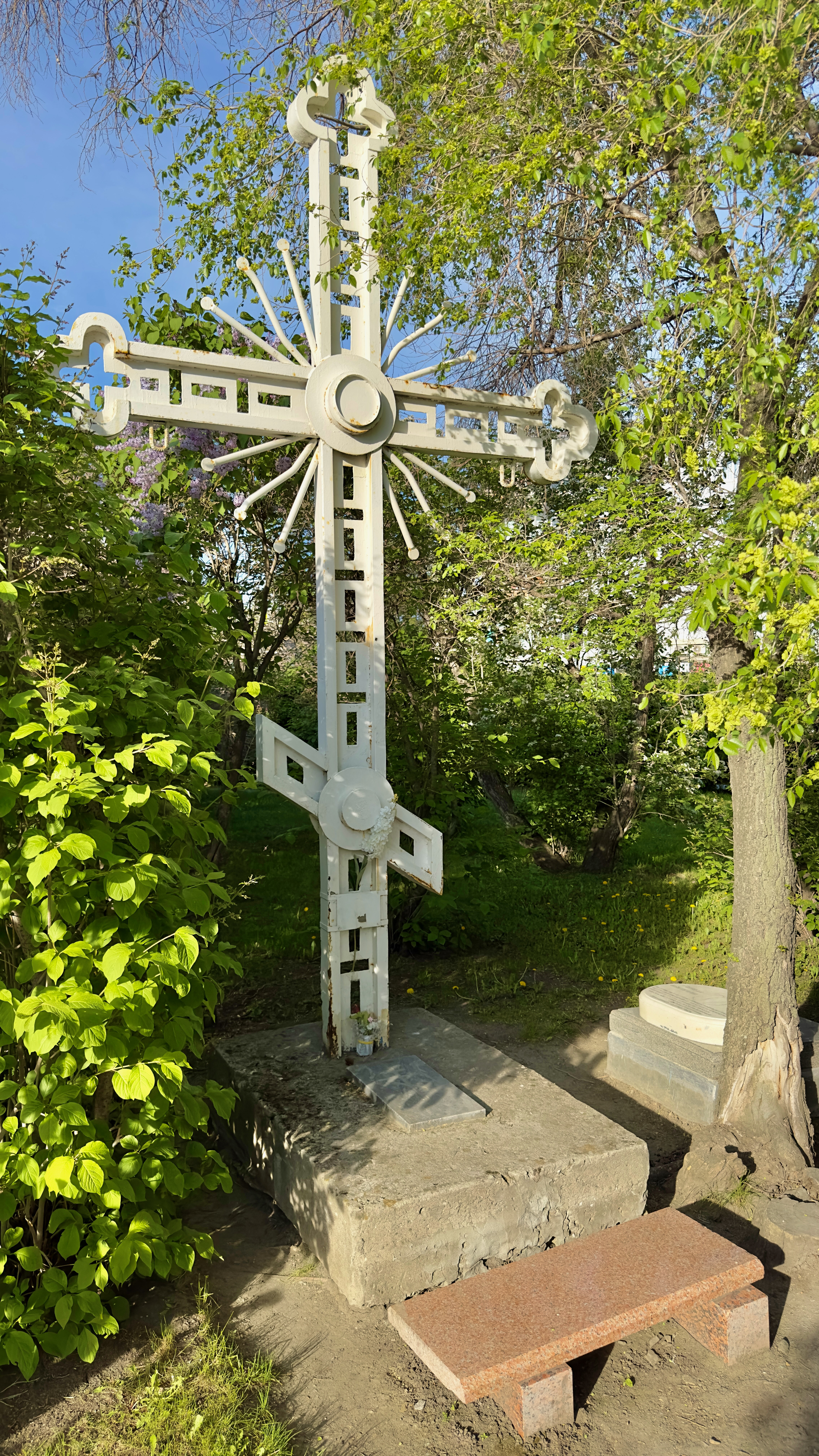
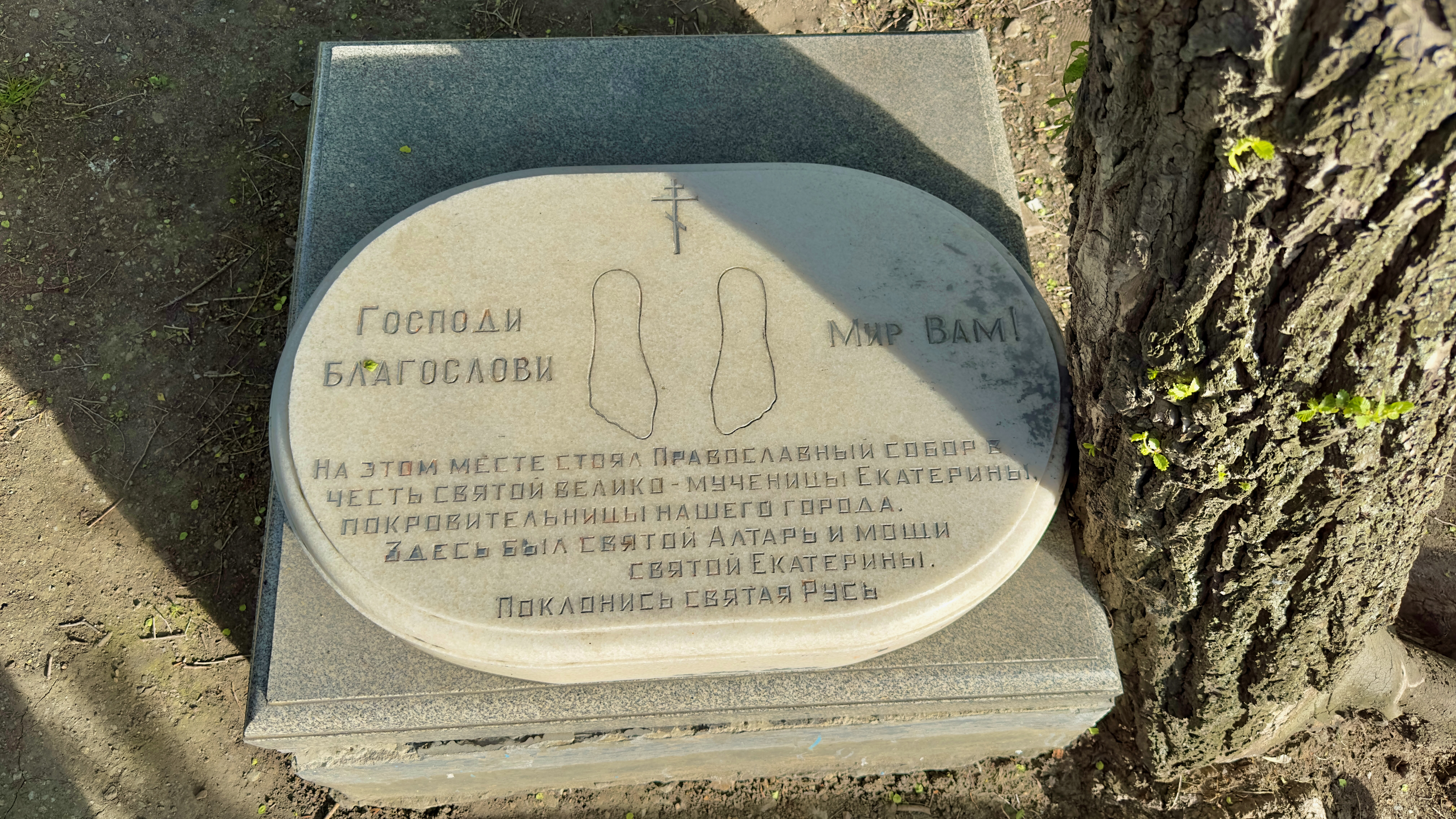

On August 18, 1991, a memorial cross was erected where the cathedral's altar stood, with an annual moleben held there on Saint Catherine's memorial day. In 1998, for Yekaterinburg's 275th anniversary, a five-domed stone Chapel of Saint Catherine was built nearby, designed by architect A. V. Dolgov. In December 2010, the relics of Great Martyr Catherine were brought to the chapel in a procession, a first for Yekaterinburg.

In March 2010, the Yekaterinburg Diocese, supported by governor A. S. Misharin, announced plans to rebuild the Catherine Cathedral at Truda Square. The project proposed retaining the chapel as an extension, erecting a stone fence around the church, and building an underground parking lot, removing the fountain and park greenery. The proposal to rebuild at Truda Square, a popular recreational area, sparked debate, with Yekaterinburg's cultural, scientific, political, and business figures divided. Polls showed 70–92% of residents opposed construction.

In March 2016, the diocese abandoned plans to rebuild at the original site, proposing a new church on a man-made island at the Melkovskaya arrow of the City Pond, in Russian style. Public protests resumed, prompting city authorities to halt discussions.

In September 2018, ahead of Yekaterinburg's 300th anniversary, the city planning council approved a concept to build the Cathedral of Saint Great Martyr Catherine at Oktyabrskaya Square near the Drama Theatre. Unlike the historical design, the new cathedral's appearance was distinct. Investors included the Ural Mining and Metallurgical Company and Russian Copper Company, with plans to improve the surrounding area. Preparatory work began on May 13, 2019, triggering protests, disturbances, and police detentions. On May 16, President V. V. Putin initiated a local poll on the construction. The Socium foundation's survey showed 55% opposed building at the Drama Theatre park, with 27% in favor, leading to a decision to find another site. On May 22, VCIOM reported 74% of Yekaterinburg residents opposed park constructio.

Protests against church construction in the park at Oktyabrskaya Square in Yekaterinburg, March–June 2019

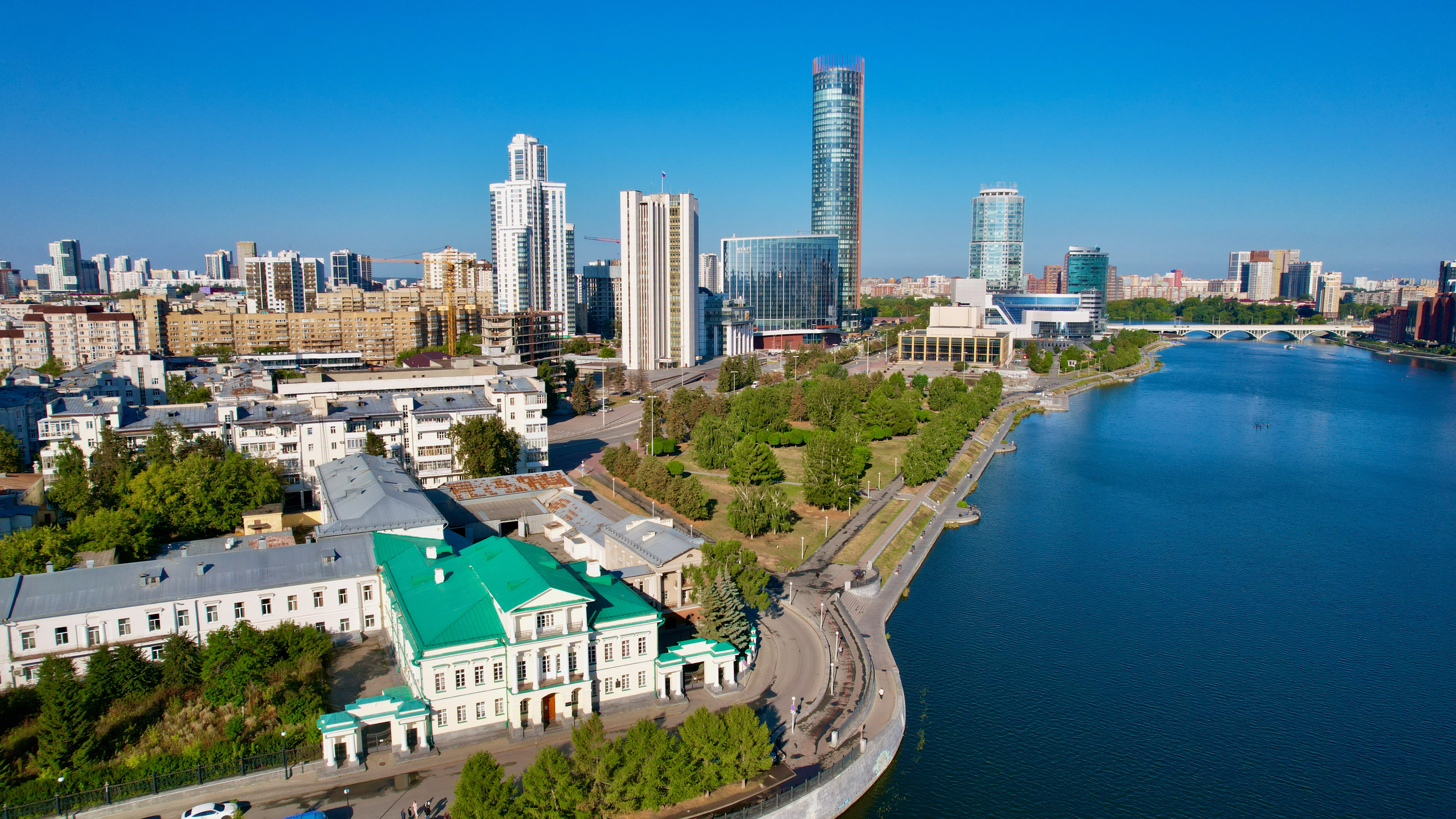
House of the Chief Mining Officer and park where the Catherine Church was planned

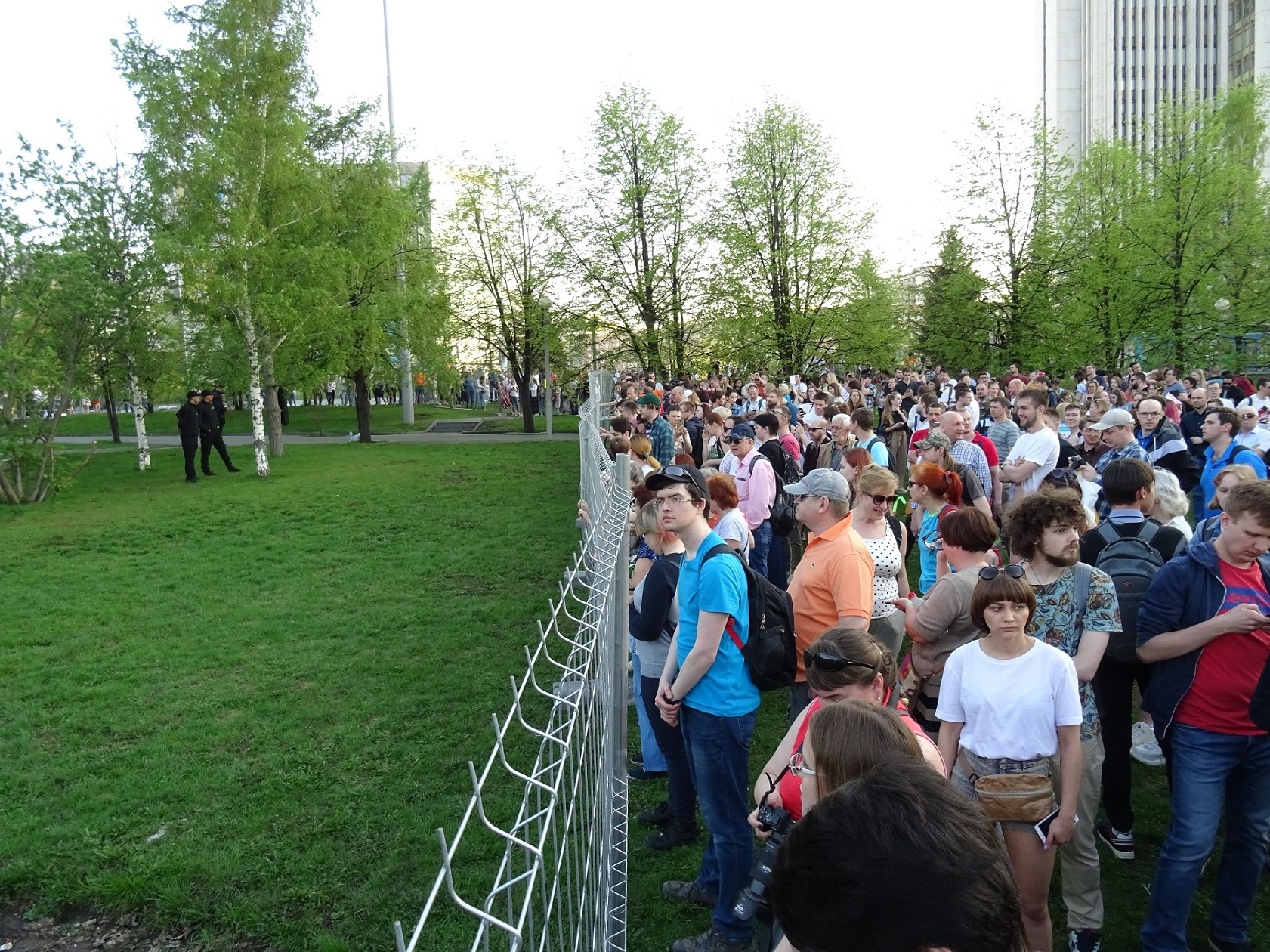

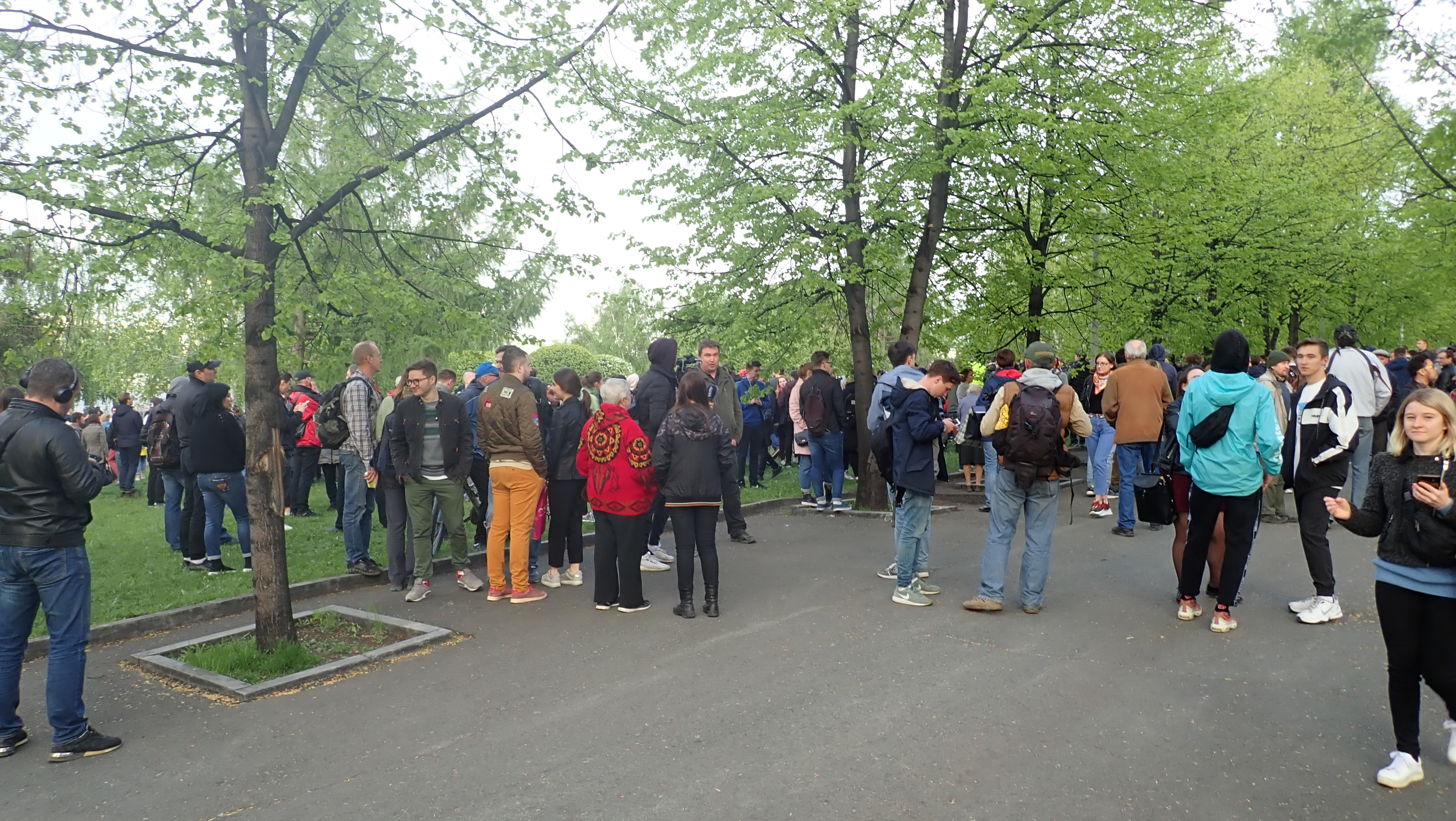

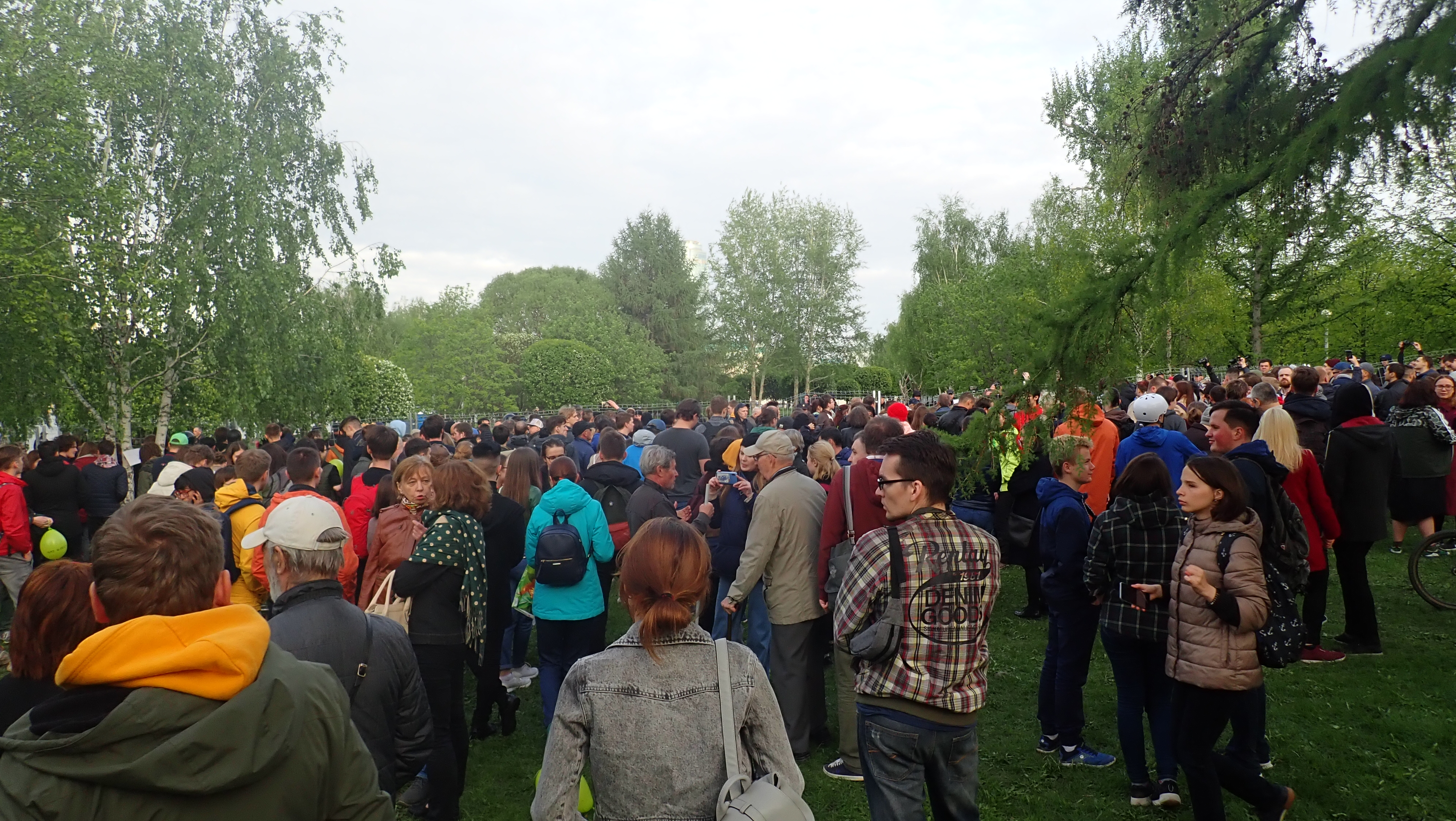

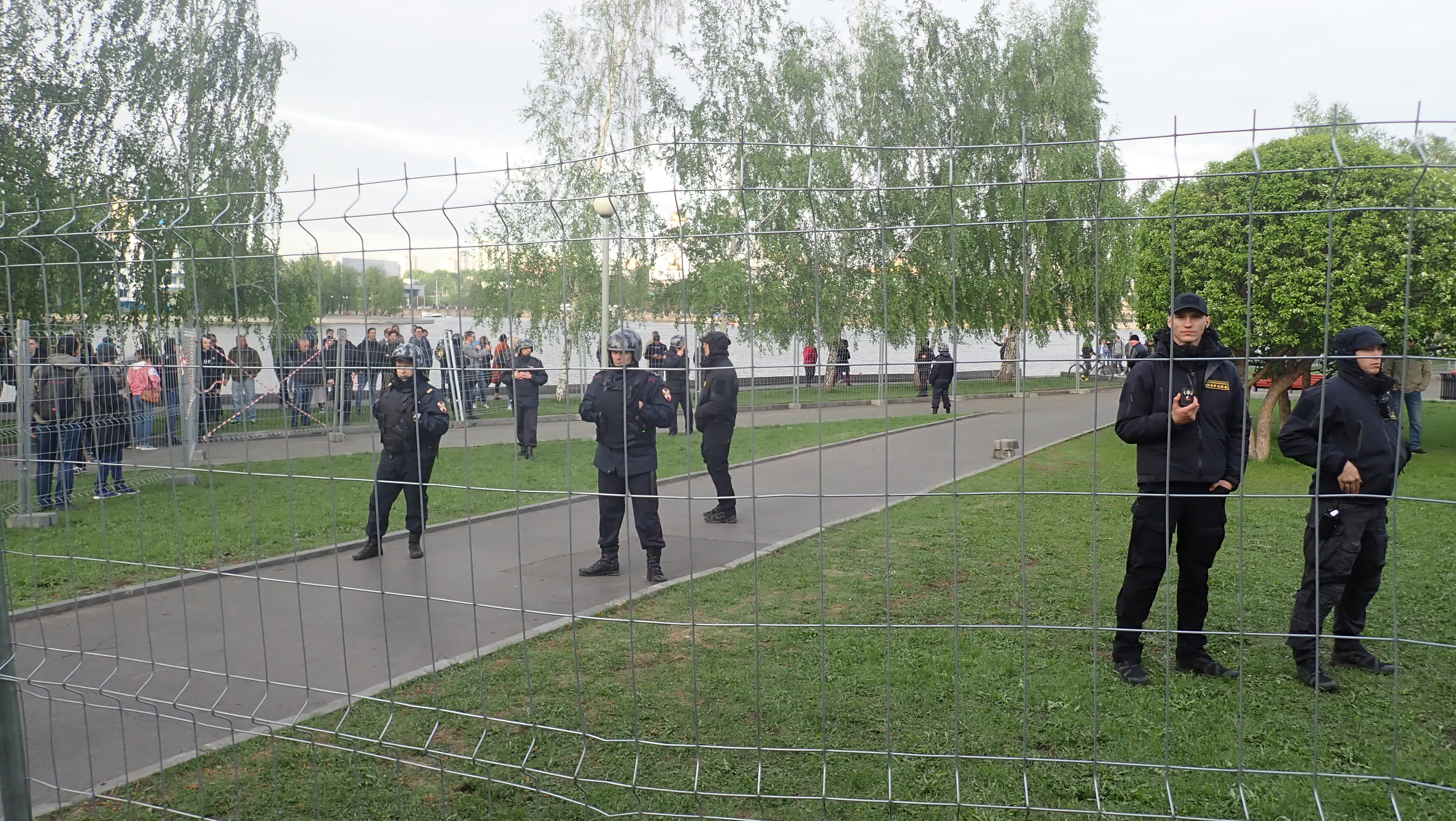

On September 13, 2019, city duma deputies held a citywide poll to choose a new church site, offering two options:

- Former Ural Instrument-Making Plant site (Gorky Street, 17);
- Plot behind Makarovsky Bridge, within Energo stroitel Street, Working Youth Embankment, and Chelyuskintsev Street.

The poll favored the former Ural Instrument-Making Plant site. In December 2020, approval was granted to demolish part of the former plant's building.

== Bibliography ==
=== Non-fiction ===
- Амур, Восточная Сибирь, Западная Сибирь и Урал: альбом в 5 т. [Amur, Eastern Siberia, Western Siberia and the Urals: album in 5 vols.] (in Russian). Vol. V: Урал. Санкт-Петербург: Карл Риккер. 1870.
- Babikin, K. T. (1923). Екатеринбург за двести лет: (1723—1923) [Ekaterinburg for two hundred years: (1723-1923)] (in Russian). Екатеринбург: Типография Гранит. p. 314.
- Simanov, I. I. (2007) [1889]. Город Екатеринбург: cборник историко-статистических и справочных сведений по городу с адресным указателем и с присоединением некоторых сведений по Екатеринбургскому уезду c планами г. Екатеринбурга и его выгона и 10-ю таблицами чертежей [City of Yekaterinburg: a collection of historical, statistical and reference information on the city with an address index and with the addition of some information on Yekaterinburg uyezd with plans of the city of Yekaterinburg and its vygon and 10 tables of drawings] (in Russian) (Reprint ed.). Ekaterinburg: Uralsky Rabochiy. p. 1051. ISBN 978-5-85383-385-2.
- Berkovich, A. V. (2015a). Екатеринбург: История города в фотографии. Фотоальбом в 3 т. [Yekaterinburg: History of the city in photography. Photo album in 3 vol.] (PDF) (in Russian). Vol. 1: Вторая половина XIX — начало XX веков. Екатеринбург: Некоммерческая организация – Фонд «Фонд развития фотографии». p. 208.
- Berkovich, A. V. (2015b). Екатеринбург: История города в фотографии. Фотоальбом в 3 т. [Yekaterinburg: History of the city in photography. Photo album in 3 vol.] (PDF) (in Russian). Vol. 2: 1914 — 1950-е годы. Екатеринбург: Некоммерческая организация – Фонд «Фонд развития фотографии». p. 208.
- Mankova, I. L. (2002). Екатерининский собор [The Catherine Cathedral] (PDF) (in Russian). Екатеринбург: Издательство Академкнига. p. 215. ISBN 5-93472-068-6.
- Екатерининский собор // Приходы и церкви Екатеринбургской епархии : Исторический очерк [St. Catherine Cathedral // Parishes and churches of Yekaterinburg diocese : Historical sketch] (in Russian). Екатеринбург: Братство св. праведного Симеона Верхотурского Чудотворца, типография Ф. К. Хомутова. 1902. p. 647.
- Preobrazhensky, A. A. (1989). История Урала с древнейших времён до 1861 года [History of the Urals from ancient times to 1861] (in Russian). М.: Наука. p. 608. ISBN 5-02-009432-3.
- Zavagelskaya (2007). Свод памятников истории и культуры Свердловской области Екатеринбург [Code of Historical and Cultural Monuments of the Sverdlovsk Region] (in Russian). Vol. 1. Екатеринбург. Екатеринбург: Издательский дом «Сократ». p. 536.
- Korepanov, N. S. (2017). Энциклопедия Екатеринбурга: в 3 т. [Encyclopedia of Yekaterinburg: in 3 vol.] (in Russian). Vol. 1. 1723—1807 годы: рождение и становлени. Екатеринбург: ООО «Туристско-информационный центр Екатеринбурга». p. 184.
- Burdenkov E. A., Smirnov L. N., E. A. (2017). Энциклопедия Екатеринбурга: в 3 т. [Encyclopedia of Yekaterinburg: in 3 vol.] (in Russian). Vol. 3. book 1. 1917—1941 годы : Центр Уральской области. Екатеринбург: ООО «Туристско-информационный центр Екатеринбурга». p. 184.
- Burlakova, N. N.; Goloborodsky, M. V.; Dolgov, A. V. (2021). Утраченные храмы Свердловской области: справочник [Lost temples of the Sverdlovsk region: a reference book] (in Russian). Екатеринбург, СПб.: Издательство УрГАХУ, издательский дом «ПервоГрад». p. 120. ISBN 978-5-7408-0299-2.
- Voroshilin, S. I. (1995). Храмы Екатеринбурга [Churches of Yekaterinburg] (in Russian). Екатеринбург: Уралмедиздат. p. 100.
- Elagin, G. N. (2011). Жизнь посвящаю городу [I dedicate my life to the city] (in Russian). Екатеринбург: TATLIN. p. 312. ISBN 978-5-903433-54-4.
- Zorina L. I., Slukin V. M. (2005). Улицы и площади старого Екатеринбурга [Streets and squares of old Yekaterinburg] (in Russian). Екатеринбург: Баско. p. 288.
- Lotareva, R. M. (2011). Города-заводы России : XVIII — первая половина XIX века [Factory towns of Russia : XVIII - first half of XIX century] (in Russian). Екатеринбург: Издательство «Сократ». p. 288. ISBN 978-5-88664-372-5.
- Mankova, I. L. (2000). Храм в сердце и памяти: очерки истории екатеринбургского Екатерининского собора [A Temple in Heart and Memory: Essays on the History of Ekaterinburg's St. Catherine's Cathedral] (PDF) (in Russian). Екатеринбург: Издательство Академкнигa. p. 144. ISBN 5-93472-013-9.
- Murzina I. Ya., Murzon A. E. (2008). Очерки истории культуры Урала: Монография [Essays on the History of Ural Culture: Monograph] (in Russian). Екатеринбург: Форум-книга. p. 412.
- Starikov, A. A.; Siminenko, V. I.; Pozdnikin, V. M. (2007). Знаменитые памятники архитектуры Свердловской области [Famous architectural monuments of the Sverdlovsk region] (in Russian). Екатеринбург: ИД «Сократ». p. 164. ISBN 978-5-88664-273-5.

=== Papers ===
- Vanchugova, N. N. (2021). Из истории каменного храмостроения в Екатеринбурге : от барокко к классицизму // Изобразительное искусство Урала, Сибири и Дальнего Востока [From the History of Stone Church Building in Yekaterinburg: From Baroque to Classicism // Fine Art of the Urals, Siberia and the Far East] (in Russian). Красноярск: Российская академия художеств. pp. 52–59.
- Vishnevskaya, A. V. (2018). Феномен межрелигиозного брака по материалам метрических книг Екатерининского собора Екатеринбурга: начало XX века: Материалы региональной научно-практической конференции, Челябинск, 29 мая 2018 года [The phenomenon of interreligious marriage on the materials of metric books of the Ekaterininsky Cathedral of Ekaterinburg: the beginning of the XX century: Materials of the regional scientific-practical conference, Chelyabinsk, May 29, 2018] (in Russian). Челябинск: Государственное учреждение «Объединённый государственный архив Челябинской области». p. 383. ISBN 978-5-6040284-2-1.
- Goloborodsky, M. V. (2010). "Роль храмов в пространственно-планировочной структуре Екатеринбурга XVIII–XIX вв" [The role of temples in the spatial-planning structure of Yekaterinburg in the XVIII-XIX centuries]. Академический вестник УралНИИпроект РААСН (in Russian) (4). Екатеринбург: 9–17.
- Golubev, V. S. (2020). Из истории обновленчества на Урале : митрополит Свердловский Корнилий (Попов) и приход Екатерининского собора // Церковь. Богословие. История [From the History of Renewalism in the Urals : Metropolitan Kornilii (Popov) of Sverdlovsk and the Parish of St. Catherine's Cathedral // Church. Theology. History] (in Russian). Екатеринбург: Екатеринбургская духовная семинария. pp. 100–106.
- Desyatov, V. G. (2012). Восстановим храм! // Академический вестник УралНИИпроект РААСН [Let's rebuild the temple!] (in Russian). Екатеринбург: Екатеринбург. pp. 91–92.
- Kazakova-Apkarimova, E. Yu. (2020). "Церковно-приходские попечительства на Урале во второй половине ХIХ — начале XX века: локальные особенности" [Church-parish trusteeships in the Urals in the second half of the 19th - early 20th centuries: local peculiarities]. История и педагогика естествознания (in Russian) (3–4): 43–48.
- Kaptikov, A. Yu. (2011). "Барокко в архитектуре Поволжья и Урала: опыт сопоставления" [Baroque in the architecture of the Volga region and the Urals: the experience of comparison]. Академический вестник УралНИИпроект РААСН (in Russian) (4): 22–27.
- Kilin A., Tretyakov V. (1997). Храмы Екатеринбурга [Yekaterinburg's churches] (PDF) (in Russian). Екатеринбург: Витта. pp. 19–24. Archived from the original (PDF) on 2018-05-14.
