= Great Zlatoust Church =

Coordinates: 56°50′03.82″N 60°36′03.65″E

- Большой Златоуст
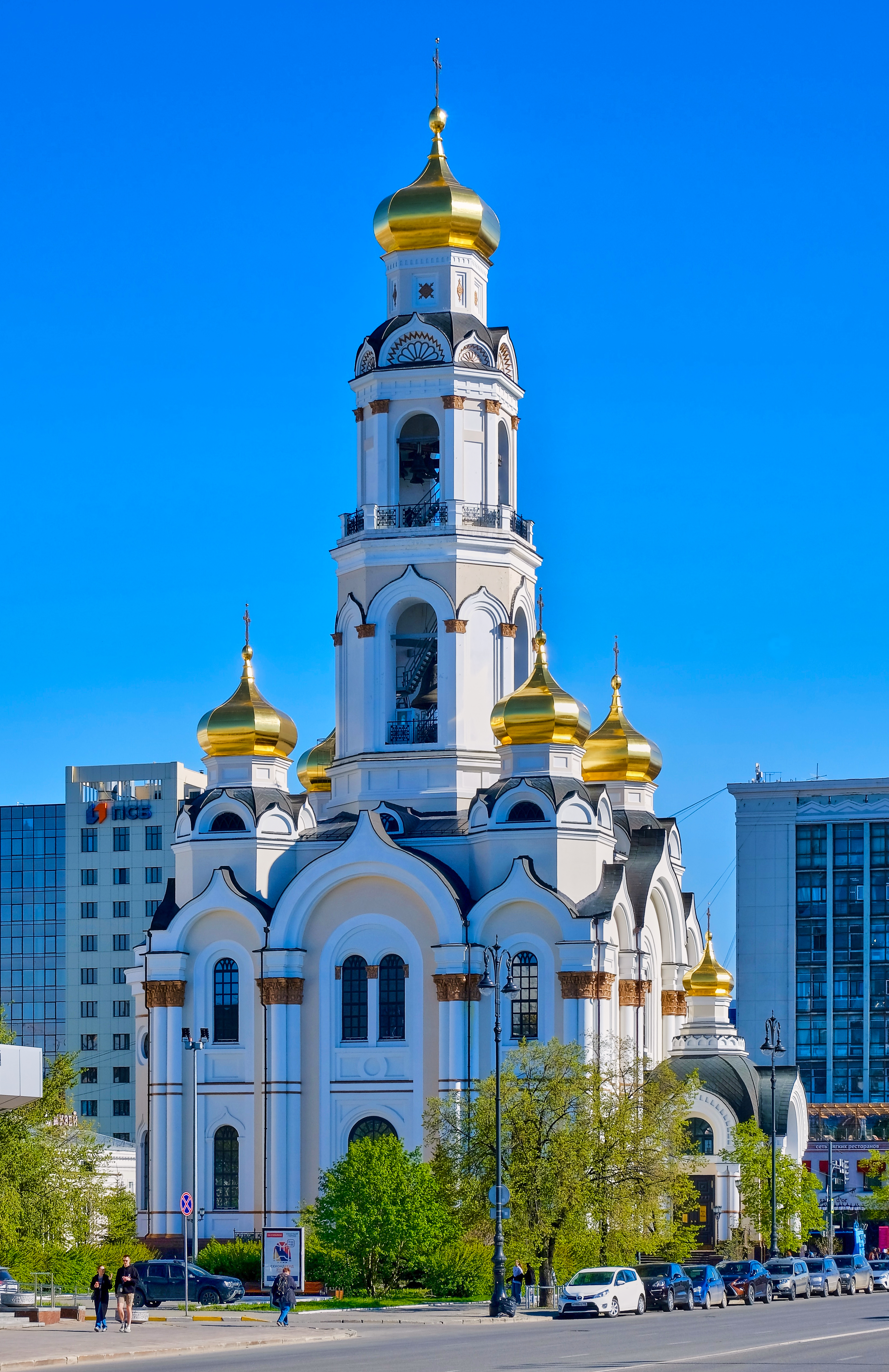
- Great Zlatoust Church
- Location: Yekaterinburg
- Country: Russia
- Denomination: Orthodoxy

History
- Founded: 1847

Architecture
- Architect: Vasily Morgan
- Architectural type: Russian-Byzantine
- Years built: 1847-1876

Administration
- Diocese: Yekaterinburg

The Bolshoi Zlatoust (Большой Златоуст) is a 77-metre (253 ft)-high bell tower that used to dominate the skyline of Yekaterinburg before the Russian Revolution. It was the tallest building in the Urals region. It was destroyed in 1930 and rebuilt 80 years later.

The name translates as "Great (or Big) Chrysostom", a reference to the Orthodox church in the name of St. John Chrysostom, who was (and is), along with St. Basil the Great and St. Gregory of Nazianzus, one of the most honoured Holy Fathers in Russia. This church occupied the place during the early 19th century. The bell tower was designed in 1847 by Vasily Morgan in a Russo-Byzantine style derived from Konstantin Thon's works. It required almost 30 years to build. The church in the ground floor was dedicated to St. Maximian, one of the Seven Sleepers and the patron saint of the Czar's son-in-law, Maximilian de Beauharnais, 3rd Duke of Leuchtenberg.

After the Russian Revolution the church of St. Maximian was closed for worship, eventually dismantled in 1930, and replaced with a statue of Lenin and Stalin. The church was rebuilt in the early 21st century. The builders relied on old photographs and descriptions.

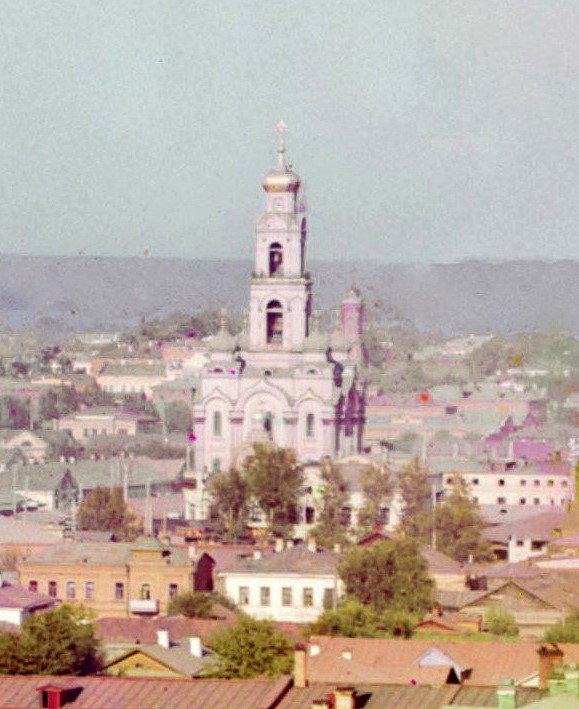
The church in 1910
(a Prokudin-Gorsky photo)

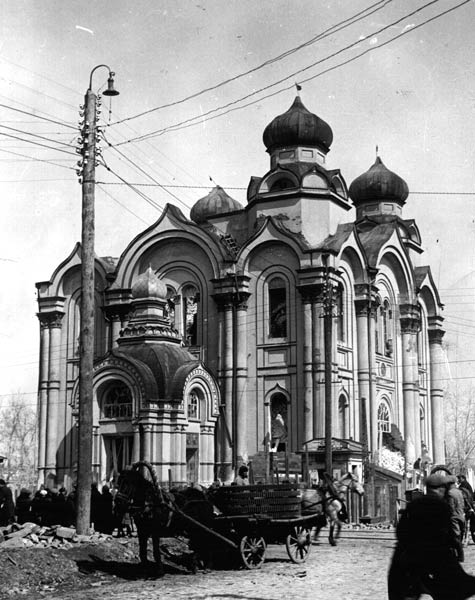
The church before destruction (late 1920s)

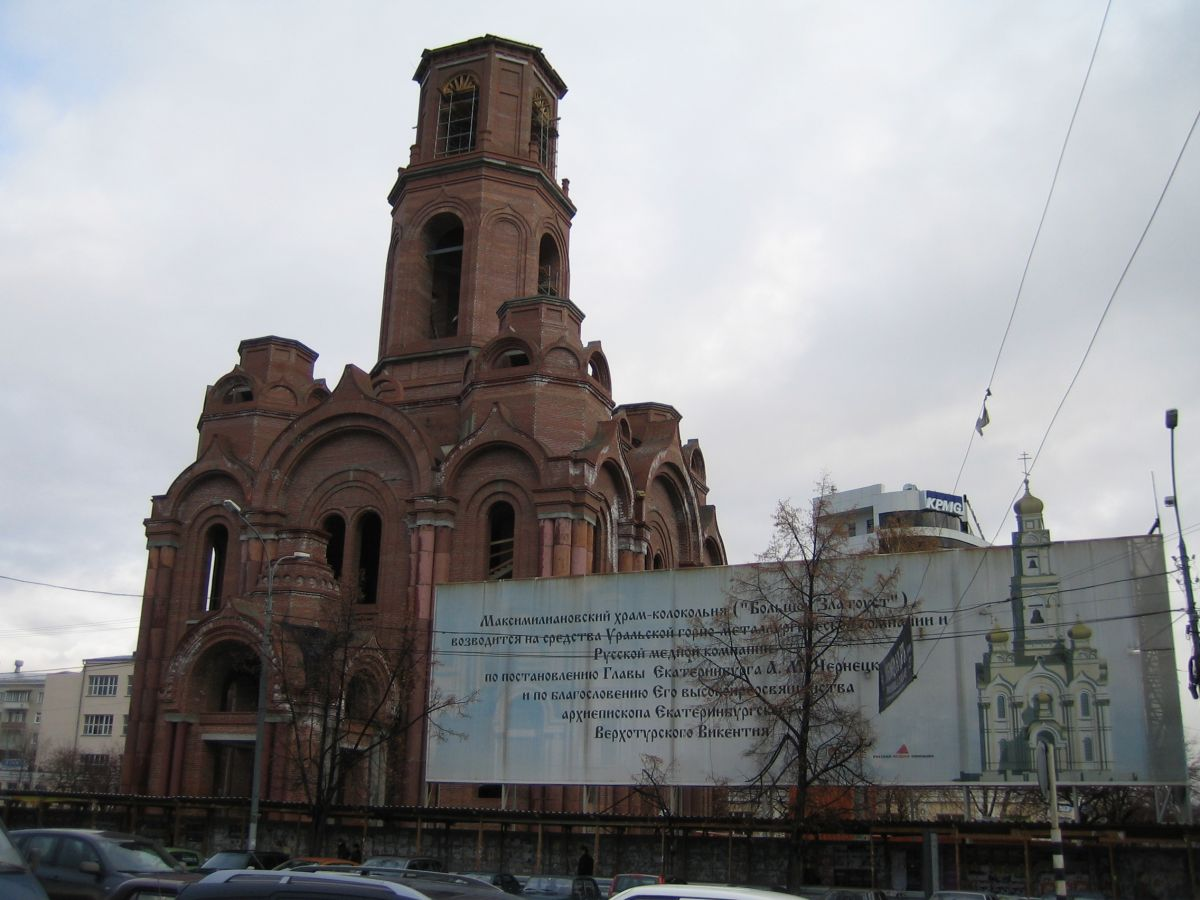
The church during reconstruction (2008)

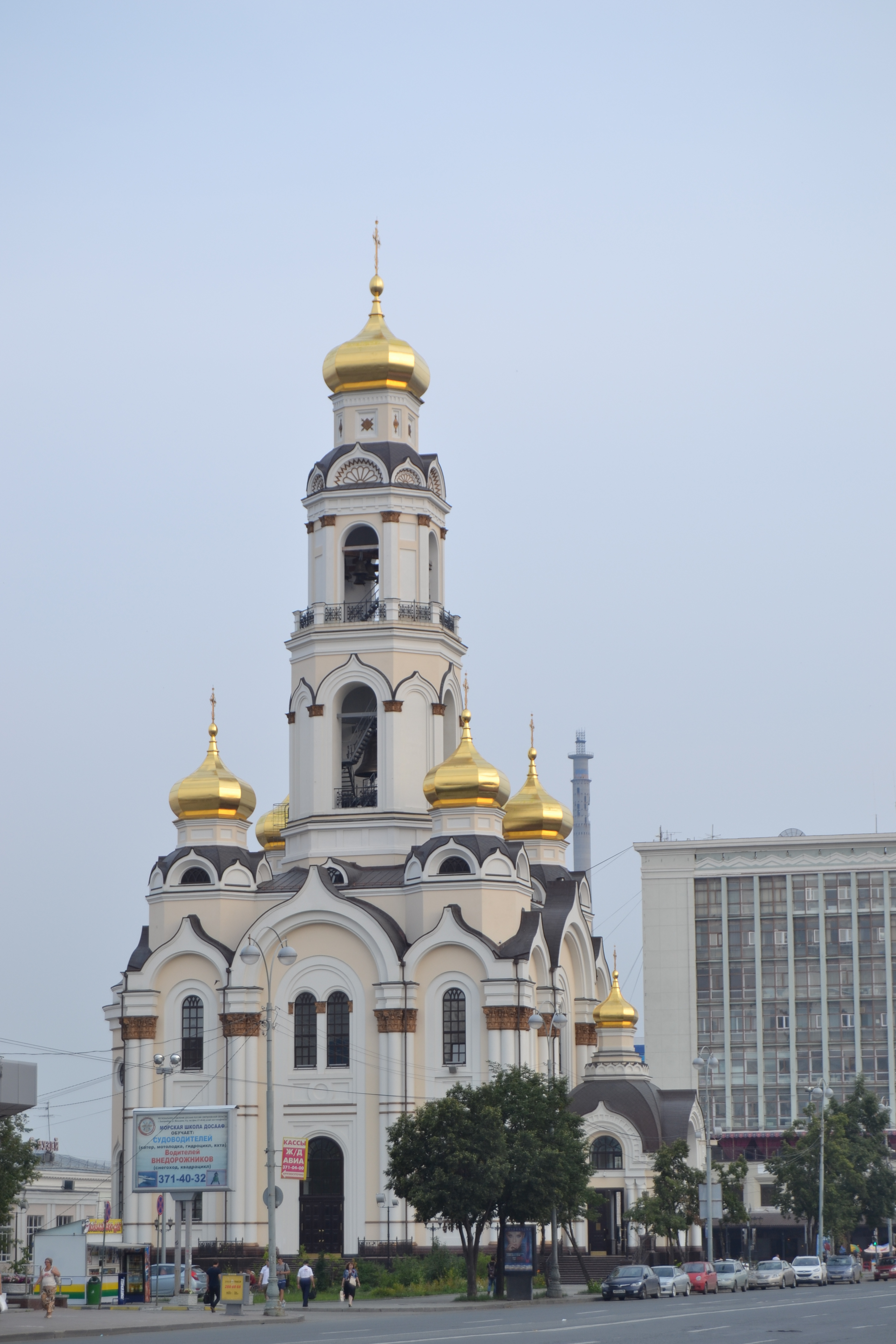
The church after reconstruction (2013)

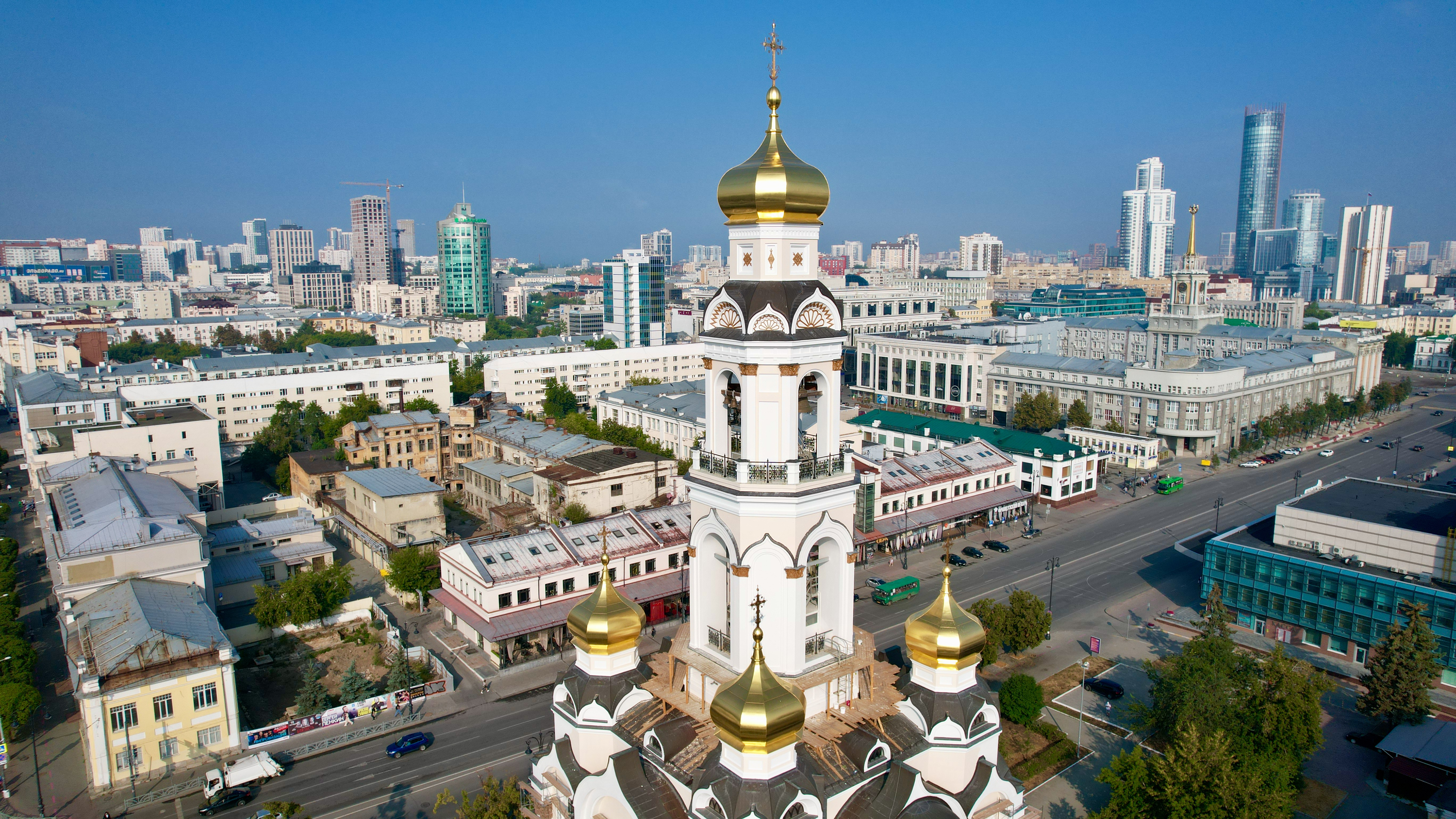
The church in 2022

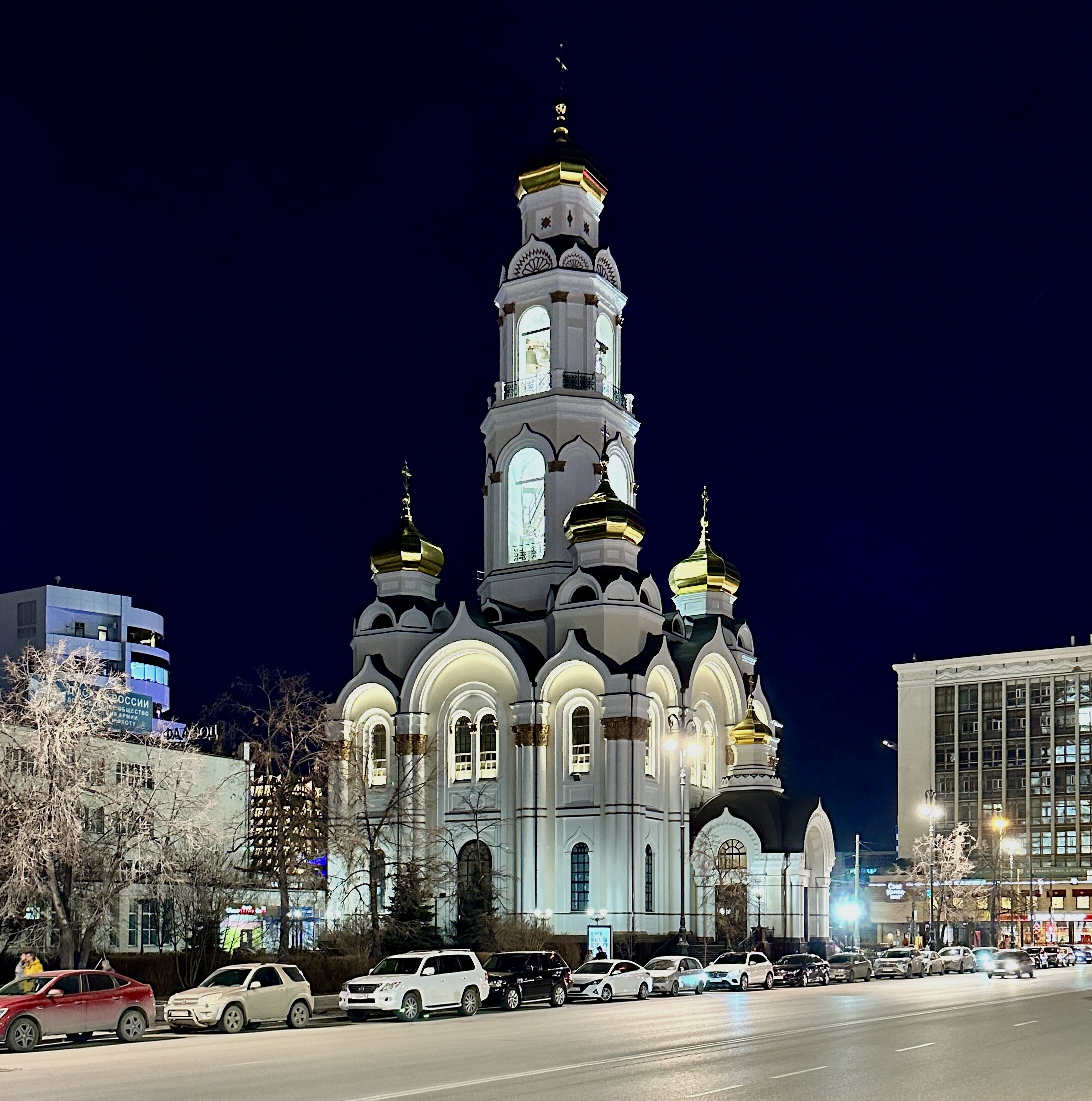
The church in 2023

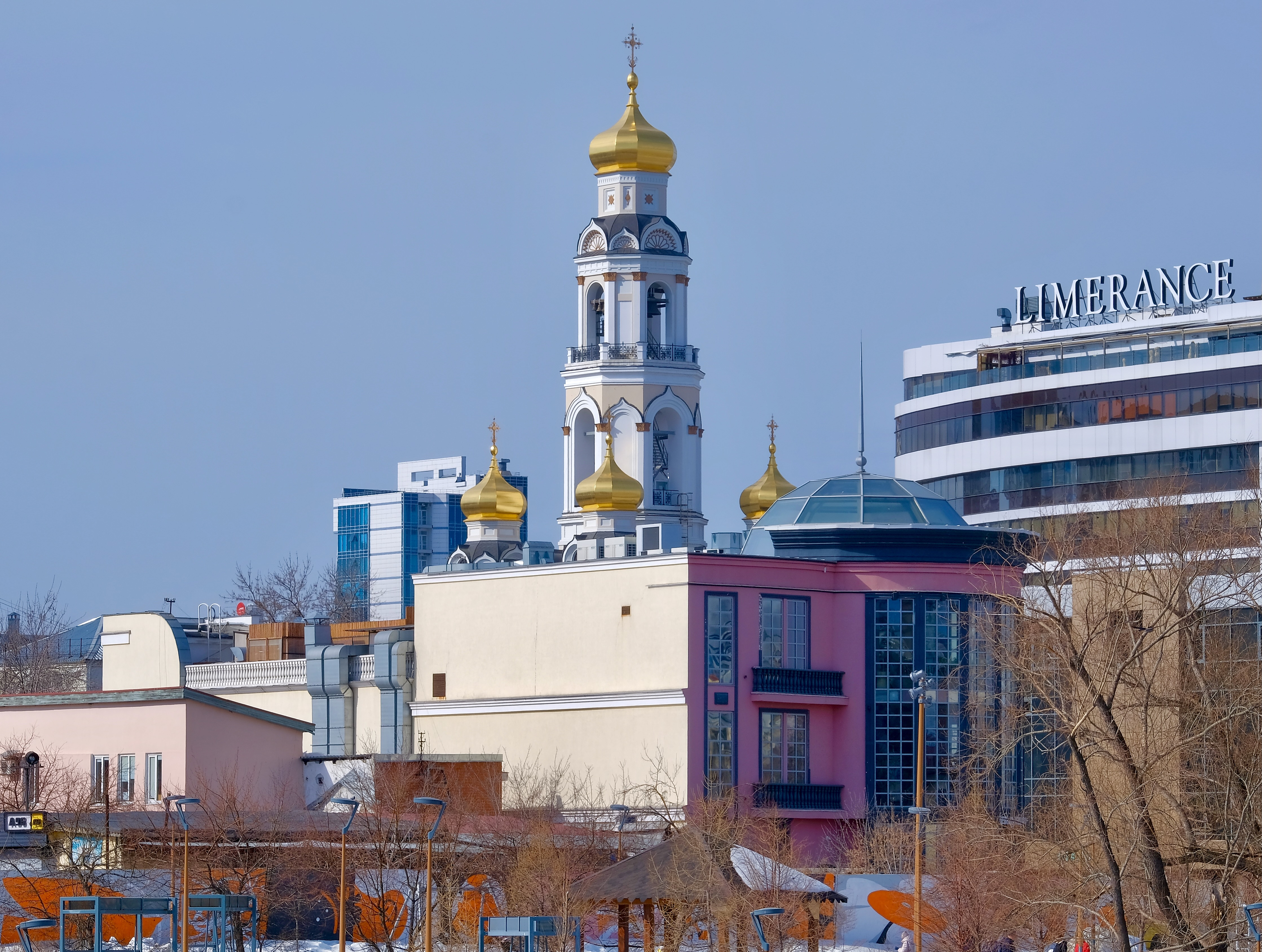
The church in March 2024
