= John Leslie (cricketer, born 1888) =

English cricketer, barrister

Personal information
- Full name: John Leslie
- Born: 26 August 1888; Westminster, London, England
- Died: 1 October 1965 (aged 77); Brancaster, Norfolk, England
- Batting: Right-handed
- Bowling: Right-arm slow
- Relatives: Charles Leslie (father); Ivor Gilliat (brother-in-law); Hubert Pilkington (brother-in-law)

Domestic team information
- Years: Team
- 1908: Oxford University

Career statistics
Competition	First-class
Matches	3
Runs scored	42
Batting average	8.40
100s/50s	–/–
Top score	23
Balls bowled	48
Wickets	0
Bowling average	–
5 wickets in innings	–
10 wickets in match	–
Best bowling	–
Catches/stumpings	4/–
- Source: Cricinfo, 20 May 2020

John Leslie DSO MC DL (26 August 1888 – 1 October 1965) was an English first-class cricketer and British Army officer.

The son of the cricketer Charles Leslie, he was born at Westminster in August 1888. He was educated at Winchester College, before going up to Trinity College, Oxford. While studying at Oxford, he made three appearances in first-class cricket for Oxford University in 1908, against the Gentlemen of England, the Marylebone Cricket Club and Worcestershire. He scored 42 runs in his three matches, with a high score of 23.

Leslie was commissioned in the Territorial Force as a second lieutenant in the Hertfordshire Yeomanry in October 1909, before being promoted to lieutenant in October 1913. Leslie served in the First World War, transferring to the 12th Royal Lancers in September 1914. During the war he was awarded the Military Cross in June 1916 and following its conclusion he was awarded the Distinguished Service Order in the 1919 New Year Honours. In March 1919, he was promoted to major. He was later appointed as a director of the Sheepbridge Coal and Iron Co., Ltd in July 1939. In 1946, he was an Ecclesiastical Commissioner. In 1938 he was a deputy lieutenant for Norfolk, before serving as High Sheriff in 1950. Leslie died in October 1965 at Brancaster, Norfolk.

He was married to Nannette Margaret Helen (née Gilliat), the sister of the cricketer Ivor Gilliat. His own sister was married to the cricketer Hubert Pilkington. Leslie's grandfather was the composer and conductor Henry David Leslie, while his great-great grandson is the actor Jack Huston.
