= White House, Kyshtym =

Coordinates: 55°42′24″N 60°32′06″E

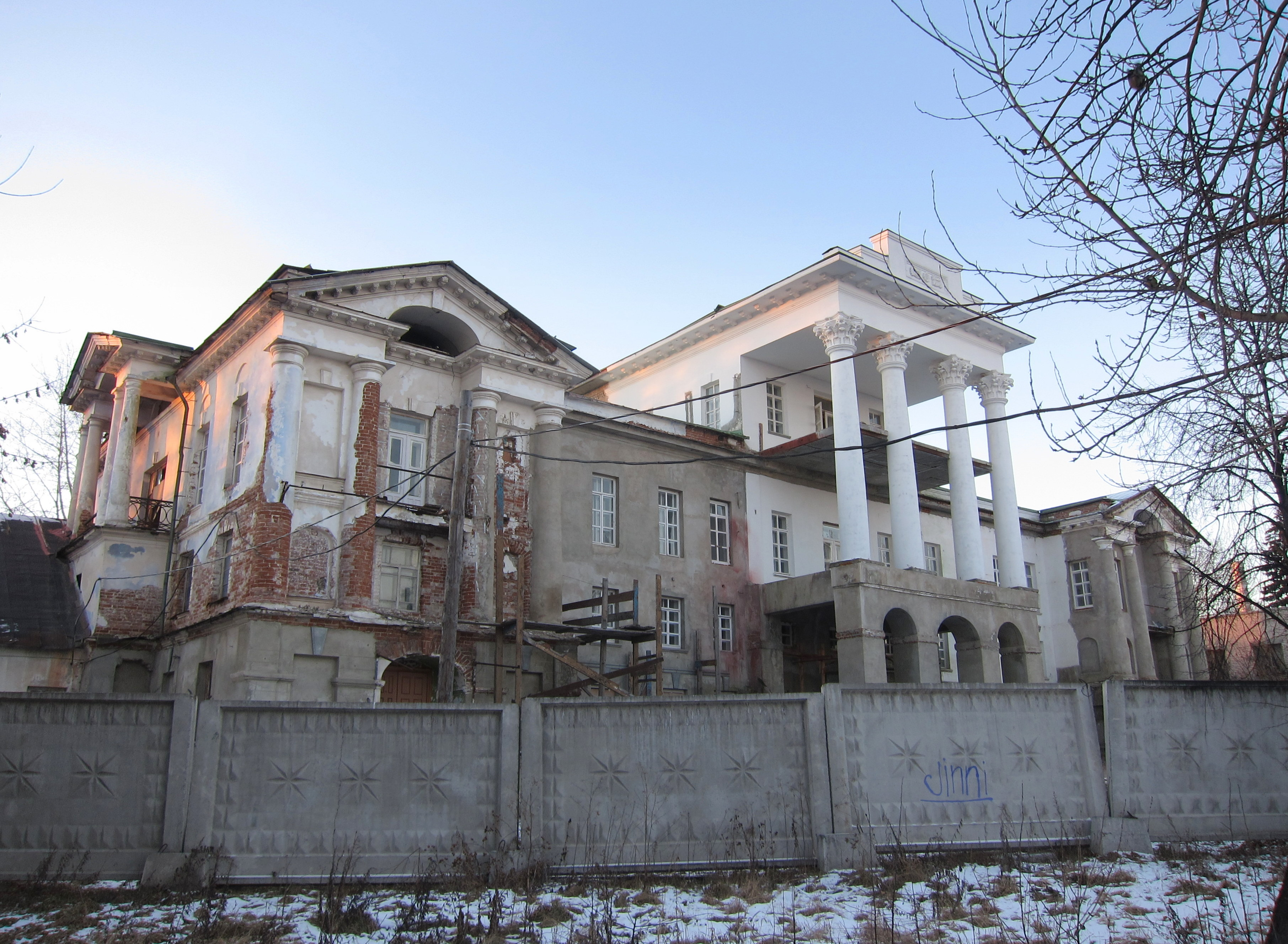
The White House in Kyshtym

The White House (also known as the Demidov Manor House) is a noted historical building in Kyshtym. The grand Palladian townhouse with two lateral towers is set on a hill in a fenced park. It is featured in Kyshtym's city emblem.

== History ==
The original house on the grounds of the Kyshtym iron works was built by Nikita Demidov's son Nikita in the mid-18th century. The current Empire style edifice was constructed in the early 19th century by the plant's next owner, Lev Rastorguyev (who also owned the immense Rastorguyev Palace in Yekaterinburg). The architect was Mikhail Pavlovich Malakhov.

Since the late 19th century the palace has housed a local museum with a choice array of mineral exhibits. During World War II the Herzen University was relocated from Leningrad to Kyshtym, with the White House serving as the main campus building. The palace is urgently in need of upkeep and repair.

== Now ==
In August 2021, the reconstruction project of the White House was included in the state program of the Ministry of Culture of the Russian Federation. In 2022, the reconstruction of the White House began. After the renovation museum of Demidov breeders is planned to open in the building.
