= Kamensk Ironworks hospital building =

Kamensk Ironworks Hospital
- Госпиталь Каменского чугунолитейного завода
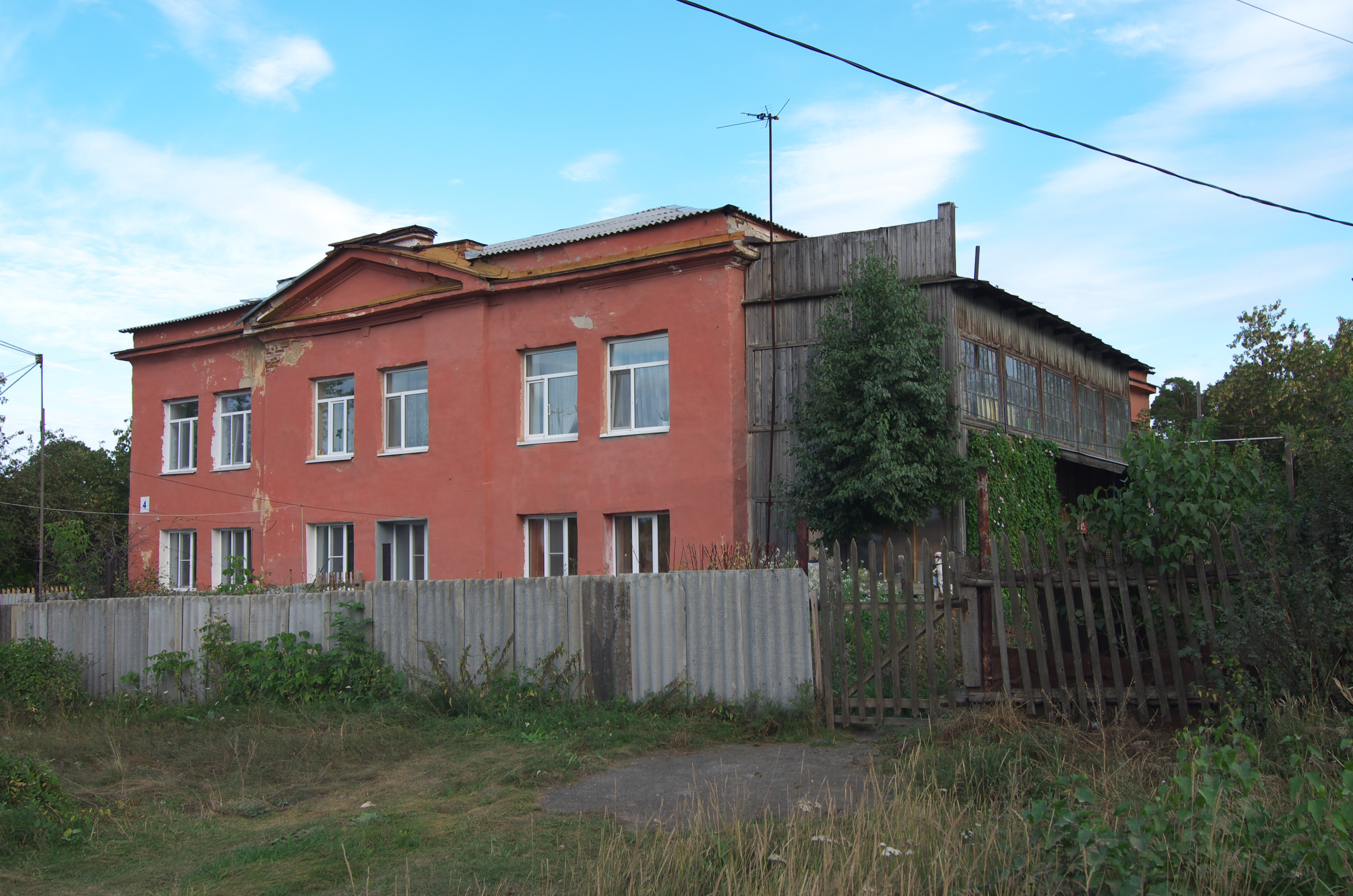
- Interactive map of the Kamensk Ironworks Hospital area

General information
- Architectural style: Сlassicism
- Location: Kamensk-Uralsky, 4 Krasnykh Orlov Street
- Coordinates: 56°24′41″N 61°53′59″E
- Completed: 1826

Design and construction
- Architect: Mikhail Pavlovich Malakhov

The Kamensk Ironworks Hospital building is a large building in the historical center of Kamensk-Uralsky, Sverdlovsk Oblast.

The building was designated a regionally significant monument on 31 December 1987 (by decision No. 535 by the executive committee of the Sverdlovsk Oblast Council of People's Deputies), under listing #661710794150005.

== History ==
Prior to the erection of the hospital building, there were already hospital wards for workers in the city, but they were scattered throughout the city and there was no clear coordination between them.

The city street network had been reorganized shortly before construction was begun on the hospital, and Krasnykh Orlov Street (formerly Verkhnyaya Novaya Street) was being modernized. The decision was made to build the hospital near the pine forest for logistical and sanitary reasons. The hospital was located along the road from the Razgulyaevsky mine to the Kamensk Ironworks.

The construction was ordered by the Kamensk State Ironworks. Ural architect Mikhail Malakhov planned the project in 1817 and construction began in 1826. The original plan called for a one-story stone structure in the style of provincial classicism with straight lines, symmetrical composition, and minimal decoration. Later, in 1847–1849, a second floor was added, providing room for more hospital beds. The building was electrified in 1906.

Currently, the building is residential.

== Architecture ==
The building is L-shaped and features a wooden extension at the southern end of the facade, wind porches, and stairs inside the courtyard. The main western facade faces Krasnykh Orlov Street. Its composition is symmetrical. The central part is distinguished by a protruding rizalit topped by a triangular pediment with a stepped parapet. The large window openings are grouped in pairs. The simple cornice is continued along the entire perimeter of the building. On the other facades, the original decor was lost.

The building's corridor-based floor plan was constructed atop a quarried stone foundation. The original inner decor was lost. The walls are constructed of solid brick, plastered, and painted. The floors are wooden, and the roof is pitched slate on wooden rafters.

== Literature ==
- ред. В.Е.Звагельская Свод памятников истории и культуры Свердловской области. Vol. 2. Екатеринбург: Сократ. 2008. p. 648. ISBN 978-5-88664-323-7.
- Памятники архитектуры Каменска-Уральского / С. И. Гаврилова, Л. В. Зенкова, А. В. Кузнецова, А. Ю. Лесунова — Екатеринбург: Банк культурной информации, 2008. — 92 с.

== Sources ==
- Неизвестный Каменск, серия 8 (Первые в городе) on YouTube
