= Mikhail Malakhov =

Mikhail Malakhov may refer to:

- Mikhail Georgiyevich Malakhov, Russian Arctic explorer, Hero of the Russian Federation
- Mikhail Malakhov (architect) (1781-1842), Russian architect
- Mikhail Malakhov (jurist) (born 1946), chief justice of the Republic of Kazakhstan from 1993 to 1996
