= Ivor Gilliat =

English cricketer and schoolmaster

Personal information
- Full name: Ivor Algernon Walter Gilliat
- Born: 8 January 1903; Eton, Buckinghamshire, England
- Died: 22 July 1967 (aged 64); Oxford, Oxfordshire, England
- Batting: Right-handed
- Bowling: Unknown
- Role: Wicket-keeper
- Relatives: Richard Gilliat (nephew); John Leslie (brother-in-law)

Domestic team information
- Years: Team
- 1922–1925: Oxford University

Career statistics
Competition	First-class
Matches	13
Runs scored	435
Batting average	25.58
100s/50s	–/3
Top score	70
Balls bowled	14
Wickets	0
Bowling average	–
5 wickets in innings	–
10 wickets in match	–
Best bowling	–
Catches/stumpings	27/8
- Source: Cricinfo, 10 May 2020

Ivor Algernon Walter Gilliat MBE (8 January 1903 – 22 July 1967) was an English first-class cricketer, amateur footballer and educator.

The son of The Reverend Walter Gilliat, he was born in April 1903 at Eton, Buckinghamshire. He was educated at Charterhouse School, before going up to Magdalen College, Oxford. While studying at Oxford, he played first-class cricket for Oxford University, making his debut against Hampshire at Oxford in 1922. He played first-class cricket for Oxford until 1925, making a total of thirteen appearances. Playing as a wicket-keeper, he scored a total of 435 runs in his thirteen matches, with an average of 25.58 and a high score of 70, which was one of three half centuries he made. In his capacity as wicket-keeper he took 27 catches and made eight stumpings.

In addition to playing cricket for Oxford University, Gilliat also played football as an inside-right for Oxford University A.F.C., for which he gained a blue to go alongside his cricket blue. He also played football for Slough Town between 1921–26 and for Oxford City. By profession, Gilliat became a schoolmaster after graduating from Oxford, becoming a master at Bradfield College and later Radley College. While at Charterhouse, he had been a member of the Charterhouse School Officers' Training Corps and in May 1927 he was commissioned as a second lieutenant in the Territorial Army. Gilliat served with the Royal Berkshire Regiment during the Second World War and was promoted to lieutenant in July 1940. He was made an MBE in the 1946 New Year Honours. Upon exceeding the age for recall in June 1953, he was removed from the Reserve of Officers' and was granted the honorary rank of major. Gilliat died at Oxford in July 1967. His nephew Richard Gilliat and brother-in-law John Leslie both played first-class cricket.
