= Kyshtym =

Kyshtym Кыштым
- Town
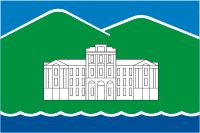
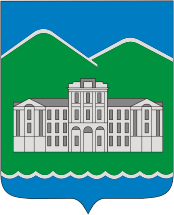
- Flag Coat of arms
- Interactive map of Kyshtym
- Location of Kyshtym Kyshtym (Chelyabinsk Oblast)
- Coordinates: 55°42′N 60°33′E
- Country: Russia
- Federal subject: Chelyabinsk Oblast
- Founded: 1757
- Town status since: 1934
- Elevation: 260 m (850 ft)

Population (2010 Census)
  - Total: 38,942
  - Estimate (2023): 35,325 (−9.3%)

Administrative status
  - Subordinated to: Town of Kyshtym
  - Capital of: Town of Kyshtym

Municipal status
  - Urban okrug: Kyshtymsky Urban Okrug
  - Capital of: Kyshtymsky Urban Okrug
- Time zone: UTC+5 (MSK+2)
- Postal code: 456870
- OKTMO ID: 75734000001

Kyshtym (Russian: Кышты́м) is a town in Chelyabinsk Oblast, Russia, located on the eastern slopes of the Southern Ural Mountains 90 kilometers (56 mi) northwest of Chelyabinsk, near the town of Ozyorsk. Population: 38,942 (2010 census); 41,929 (2002 census); 42,852 (1989 Soviet census); 36,000 (1970).

== History ==
Kyshtym was established by the Demidovs in 1757 around two factories for production of cast iron and steel. The city emblem shows the Kyshtym Manor House, a Palladian residence of Nikita Demidov Jr. According to Herbert Hoover, a small iron industry had existed there "for one hundred and fifty years", which produced a secret process for generating sheet iron "unusually resistant to rust." The process "consisted of alternately heating the sheets and sweeping them when hot with a wet pine-bough. The effect was to create a coating of iron oxide which was rust-resistant."

Baron Meller-Zakomelsky's Kyshtym estate became of interest to foreign capital, after the 1905 Russian Revolution and subsequent depression. A British consortium around Charles Leslie brought in the mining entrepreneur Leslie Urquhart, investing in Russian oil and minerals. In 1908 Leslie became Chairman of the Kyshtym Corporation, for mining. In 1910, Hoover's American company became involved.

The copper, iron and steel industry associated with mining in the area was modernized. Copper production, using pyritic smelting, eventually reached 25,000,000 pounds a year. The corporate situation was already complex, when the American interests became involved, because of tensions between the British interests, which were related by cross-holdings. In 1911 Alfred Chester Beatty visited Kyshtym, on behalf of the American interests. By 1912 the future direction was set for investment in the Urals, with Beatty and Urquhart allied, and the British group around Leslie excluded.

Kyshtym was granted town status in 1934.

== Administrative and municipal status ==
Within the framework of administrative divisions, it is, together with twelve rural localities, incorporated as the Town of Kyshtym—an administrative unit with the status equal to that of the districts. As a municipal division, the Town of Kyshtym is incorporated as Kyshtymsky Urban Okrug.

== Nuclear disaster ==
Kyshtym is near the Ozyorsk nuclear complex, also known as "Mayak" ("lighthouse" in Russian), where on September 29, 1957, a violent explosion involving dry nitrate and acetate salts in a waste tank containing highly radioactive waste, contaminated an area of more than 15,000 square kilometers (Ozyorsk was the town built around the Mayak combine, but it was a closed city, which was not marked on maps, thus making Kyshtym the nearest town to the location of the disaster). The explosion resulted from a failure of the cooling system of the tank.

There was a release of 740 PBq of fission products, approximately 10% of which was dispersed into the atmosphere. Cerium-144 and Zirconium-95 (both relatively short lived isotopes with a half life of 285 and 64 days respectively) made up 91% of the release. There was 1 PBq of Sr-90, and 13 TBq of Cs-137. The contaminated zone, called East Urals Radioactive Trace (EURT), measuring 300 x 50 km was contaminated by more than 4 kBq/m^{2} of Sr-90. The global fallout of Sr-90 was about 2 kBq/m^{2}. An area measuring 17 km^{2} was contaminated by about 100 MBq Sr-90/m^{2}.

There were 270,000 inhabitants of the area. Mass evacuation was carried out as the critical contamination resulted from Sr-90 with a half-life of 28.8 years. About 800 km^{2} of land were taken out of use, and 82% of this area has now been taken into use again for forestry and farming. However, evacuation was limited to the nearest settlements leading to more than 1000 acknowledged victims. It was estimated in 1990 that at this time, around 10,000 people lived in areas where the level of ambient radiation was more than quadruple that of the average in Chernobyl's restricted area after 1986.

The Kyshtym accident was largely concealed by the Soviet government until 1980, when the Soviet biologist Zhores Medvedev revealed its existence.

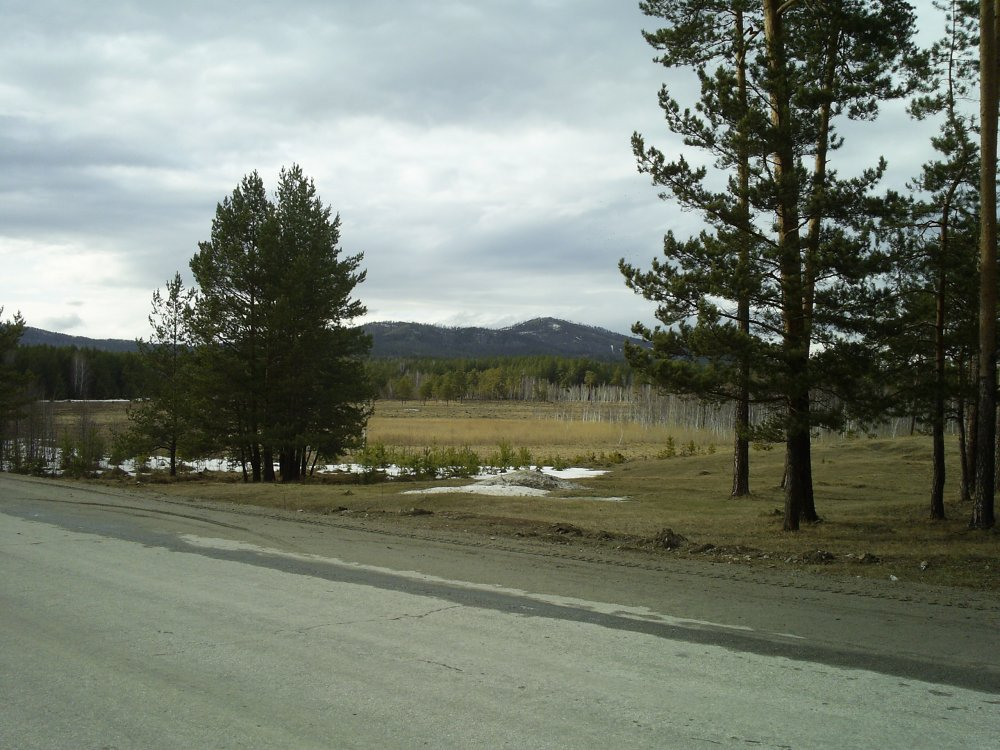
Mount Yegoza near Kyshtym

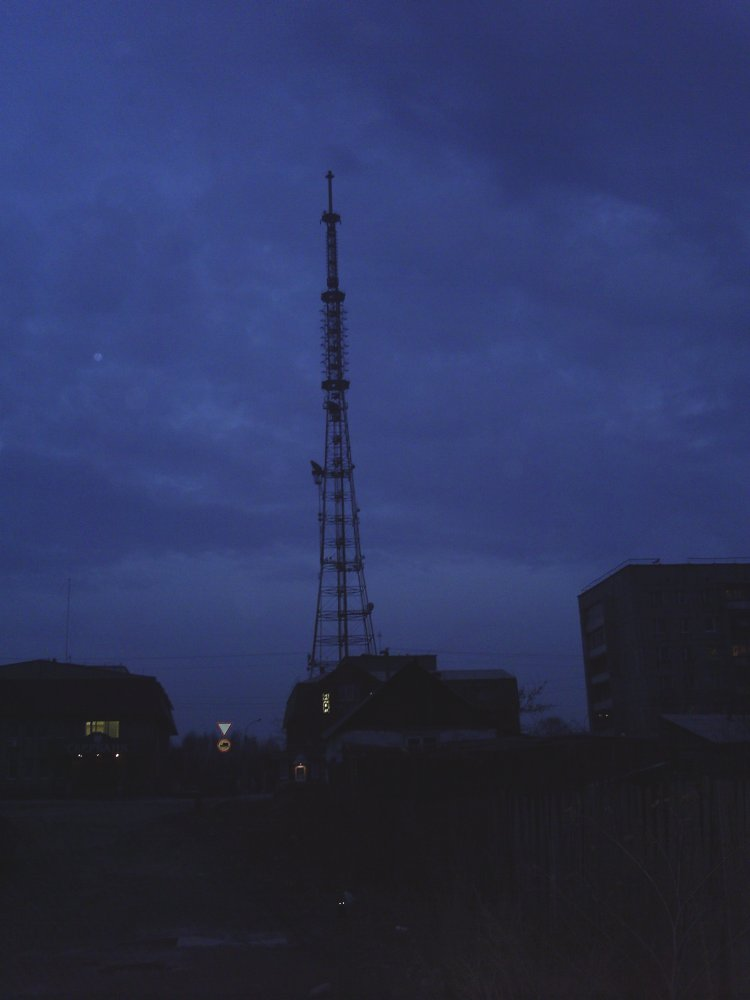
Kyshtym radio and TV tower

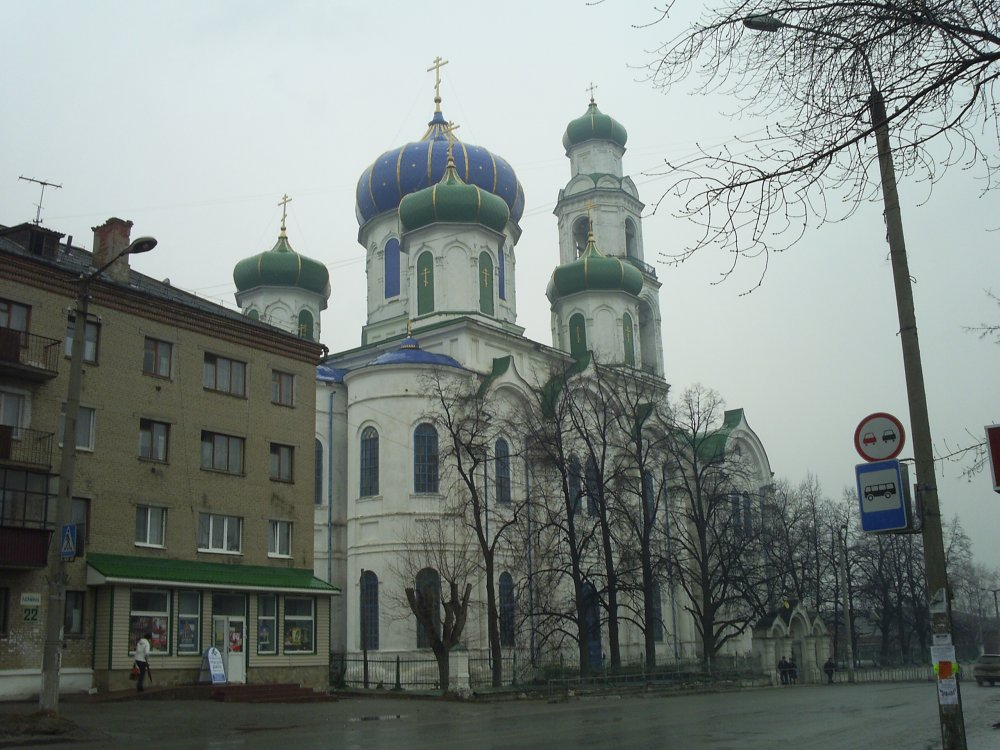
Church of the Nativity of Christ
