= Leslie Urquhart =

Scottish mining engineer

John Leslie Urquhart (11 April 1874 – 13 March 1933) was a Scottish mining engineer, entrepreneur and millionaire.

== Early life ==
He was born on 11 April 1874 to Scottish parents, Andrew and Jean Urquhart, in Aydın, 81 miles (130 km) from Smyrna in the Ottoman Empire. His father was engaged in the export trade of licorice root and paste, the extract from which was widely used in the pharmaceutical and tobacco industries, as well as confectionery production.

Urquhart went to an English school in Smyrna from age 7. In 1887 the family moved to Scotland, settling at Portobello, Edinburgh. Urquhart went to school there, then in Edinburgh, and in 1890 took up an engineering apprenticeship with Crow, Harvey & Co. of Glasgow, also attending evening classes at the Glasgow and West of Scotland Technical College. His father was at Oudjari (Ujar), now in Azerbaijan, with a business venture. He also studied chemistry under Stevenson Macadam at Edinburgh University, and in 1896 was set for a career in the oil industry. He was diverted, however, to Ujar and his father's licorice interests there, as the manager of the Oriental Trading Corporation factory there. Thomas Urquhart, his uncle and an engineer who had supervised the Gryazi–Tsaritsyn railway line in Russia, may have influenced his decision. The oil at Baku was possibly another factor: he made a trip there in 1897, and by 1898 had made good progress in the local languages.

== Oilman in Baku ==
In 1902 Urquhart was offered work by the Schibaieff Petroleum Company, at a time when licorice was in glut, and became a manager for them at Baku. The factory was sold and the Oriental Trading Corporation wound up in 1903, as the American Liquorice Trust sought to create a cartel. British capital was at this point prominent in the Baku oilfields, with at least five companies buying in from 1896. There was some notable sharp practice in deals.

The dealings of George Tweedy, in particular, for Baku-Russian Petroleum, brought Charles Leslie, a director of the company, to Baku in 1904. He struck up a friendship with Urquhart. When he was forced to leave the oil business, two years later, Urquhart was able to set up the Anglo-Siberian Company in London, for mining, by combining his contacts with Leslie's.

The change was precipitated by political events, starting with a wave of strikes in Baku, and the fall of Sergei Witte, in 1903. It was followed by the Russo-Japanese War, and communal violence between Armenians and Tatars in Baku during February 1905. In private, Urquhart, who employed Tatars and spoke their language, entirely took their side. The disturbances of the 1905 Russian Revolution that took place in Baku in September of that year were particularly bloody. Urquhart was awarded an Albert Medal for Lifesaving, the citation noting his position as British Vice-Consul in Baku, and his actions to save four British workmen in September 1905, with Tatar and Cossack support.

After a complex series of events and negotiations, Urquhart left revolutionary Baku on instructions from the British Foreign office and companies, reaching Moscow on 25 September. His life was said to be in danger, but he was also much criticised.

== Kyshtym ==
Urquhart's setting up of the Anglo-Siberian Corporation then led to other vehicles for capital. The Perm Corporation was likewise intended to exploit minerals in the Urals, and Anglo-Siberian took it over in 1908, once it had acquired the Kyshtym Mining Works of 1900, a Russian company. The Kyshtym Corporation Ltd. then bought the shares from the Perm Corporation. Exploratory surveys at Kyshtym for Anglo-Siberian had confirmed the presence of deposits of copper, iron and sulphur; and gold in the Soymonovsk Valley. The result was that the mineral resources of the Kyshtym estate were controlled by a board chaired by Charles Leslie, on which Urquhart sat. In autumn 1908 Urquhart and Semmy Joseph Blumlein, managing director, went to Kyshtym and supervised investment, including rail track and a smelter.

The complex corporate situation proved unstable, because of tensions between British interests related by cross-holdings. American interests became involved. In 1911 Alfred Chester Beatty visited Kyshtym, on behalf of the American interests. By 1912 the future direction was set for investment in the Urals, with Beatty and Urquhart allied, and the British group around Leslie excluded.

At this period, Urquhart also acquired interests in what is now Kazakhstan. They were in lead and zinc at Ridder, and coal at Ekibastuz. He chaired the Irtysh Corporation, which held the Kirgiz Coal Mining Company, the owner of the mines. The Irtysh Corporation, in turn, was financed by the Russo-Asiatic Corporation, a British company of which Urquhart was a director. It had been set up in 1912, when it was partly owned by Anglo-Siberian, with two banks; but Anglo-Siberian was wound up shortly after that. Other holdings were at Tanalyk in Orenburg Oblast. They produced copper, and Baron Meller-Zakomelsky, whose family estate was at Kyshtym, invited Urquhart to become a partner in the venture, around 1911.

== Aftermath of the Russian Revolution ==
A consequence of the 1917 Russian Revolution was the nationalisation of mining interests in the former Russian Empire. Urquhart in 1921 became President of the Association of British Creditors of Russia (ABC of Russia), a broad-based pressure group. His personal objective was to secure for Russo-Asiatic a concession to run again the corporation's mining sites, under the new regime. The Hands Off Russia campaign by the British Left had little purchase, but the Lloyd George administration was keen to trade with the Soviet Union.

Urquhart was a strong opponent of the Bolsheviks, and as a backer of Alexander Kolchak an advocate of the Allied intervention in the Russian Civil War. Under Sir Charles Eliot, British Commissioner in Siberia, he ran through staff the Siberian Supply Company that operated in 1918–9 behind the White Russian lines, but no further west than Harbin.

A 1921 agreement made by Urquhart with Leonid Krasin fell through, undermined by a public attack by Urquhart on the Cheka, and Lenin's wish to make an anti-British gesture. By the time of the Genoa Conference (1922), however, Urquhart had come to favour a more co-operative attitude to the Soviet Union. His dealings, however, were caught up with the international tensions caused by the events around the Armistice of Mudanya in October 1922. The Soviets were snubbed by a virtual exclusion from the subsequent Conference of Lausanne. Arthur Ransome argued that their assumption that treating Urquhart harshly would affect the British government was based on faulty reasoning.

During the New Economic Policy period, Urquhart persisted in efforts to secure concessions in the territory of the USSR. Lenin's view of 1922 was the Ekibastuz site should not be wholly granted as a concession to Urquhart. By 1925 there was local resistance, for example in the Kazakh Republic by Nikolai Yezhov. Urquhart's approach to dealing with the Soviet concessions, and Georgy Pyatakov who controlled them, on behalf of the Russo-Asiatic Consolidated group, contrasted with the subtler and more accommodating tactics employed by Herbert Guedalla and Grigori Benenson (1860–1939) for the Imperial and Foreign Corporation, also based in London. They gained control of Lena Goldfields, by business manipulations, and had a much freer hand in the USSR. Urquhart shunned chances to ally with them.

Urquhart attempted, through Midian Ltd., to exploit sites formerly in the Ottoman Empire, to the south of the Dead Sea; but the British government favoured the interests of the Turkish Petroleum Company.

== Later life ==
In the later 1920s Urquhart was heavily involved in the Mount Isa Mines (MIM) of Queensland in Australia. He repeated there a pattern of local development of towns that he had carried out in pre-war Russia. The Urquhart Shale ore body is named for him. The Australian mining consultant William Henry Corbould, who had worked at Mount Isa, went on in 1928 to survey Edie Creek in the Territory of New Guinea, for Urquhart and the Ellyou Goldfields Development Corporation. There resulted the New Guinea Goldfields Ltd. subsidiary of MIM.

== Awards and honours ==
Urquhart received the Russian imperial Order of Saint Stanislaus, 2nd class with star, in 1916.

== Personal life ==
Urquhart married American-born Eugenie Beryl da Silva-Bald in 1909; her father was English, her mother from Illinois. The wedding was in London, but the couple went then to Kyshtym, where their first son Kenneth was born the following year. At the end of 1911 Urquhart bought Brasted Place, in Brasted, Kent, England, as a family home, from Henry Avray Tipping. The children of the marriage were:

- Kenneth Leslie, born 1910 in Kyshtym, died 1974.
- Ronald Neil, born 1911 in Kyshtym, died 1942.
- Ian Andrew, born 1914 at Brasted
- Neil Roy Leslie, born 1915 at Brasted
- Jean Leslie, born 1918, who married in 1942 William Robert Brudenell Foster, died 1986.

Urquhart died in London on 13 March 1933.
