= Richard Gilliat =

English cricketer (born 1944)

Personal information
- Full name: Richard Michael Charles Gilliat
- Born: 20 May 1944 (age 82); Ware, Hertfordshire, England
- Batting: Left-handed
- Bowling: Leg break
- Relatives: Ivor Gilliat (uncle)

Domestic team information
- Years: Team
- 1964–1967: Oxford University
- 1966–1978: Hampshire
- 1968–1976: Marylebone Cricket Club

Career statistics
Competition	First-class	List A
Matches	269	165
Runs scored	11,589	2,896
Batting average	29.33	21.61
100s/50s	18/61	–/12
Top score	223*	89*
Balls bowled	122	–
Wickets	3	–
Bowling average	52.33	–
5 wickets in innings	–	–
10 wickets in match	–	–
Best bowling	1/3	–
Catches/stumpings	221/–	83/–
- Source: Cricinfo, 10 October 2009

Richard Michael Charles Gilliat (born 20 May 1944 in Ware, Hertfordshire) is a retired English first-class cricketer.

Gilliat was educated at Charterhouse and Christ Church, Oxford. He represented Oxford University and Hampshire as a left-handed batsman and very occasional leg-break bowler in 269 first-class matches (1964–1978) and 165 List A matches (1968–1978).

His most successful season with the bat was 1969, when he scored the fastest century of the County Championship season (against Essex at Ilford), his highest score (223 not out against Warwickshire at Southampton), and finished with 1386 runs at 39.60, including six centuries.

After succeeding Roy Marshall as County Captain of Hampshire (1971–1978), he led the 1st XI to the 1973 County Championship. He also served as Assistant Secretary under Desmond Eagar.

After his cricket career he returned to Charterhouse as a teacher and housemaster. Following his effective stewardship as housemaster, he was appointed Second Master in 1996 and held this position until his retirement in summer 2004. His uncle, Ivor Gilliat, also played first-class cricket.

Sporting positions
Preceded by Roy Marshall	Hampshire cricket captain 1971–1978	Succeeded by Bob Stephenson
