= Steve Marsh (cricketer) =

English cricketer (born 1961)

Personal information
- Full name: Steven Andrew Marsh
- Born: 27 January 1961 (age 65); Westminster, London, England
- Batting: Right-handed
- Role: Wicket-keeper
- Relatives: Bob Wilson (father-in-law)

Domestic team information
- Years: Team
- 1982–1999: Kent
- First-class debut: 1 May 1982 Kent v Oxford University
- Last First-class: 18 September 1999 Kent v Gloucestershire
- List A debut: 24 June 1984 Kent v Derbyshire
- Last List A: 17 September 2000 Kent v Worcestershire

Career statistics
Competition	First-class	List A
Matches	291	313
Runs scored	10,098	2,983
Batting average	28.05	18.64
100s/50s	9/55	0/6
Top score	142	71
Balls bowled	202	9
Wickets	2	1
Bowling average	120.00	14.00
5 wickets in innings	0	0
10 wickets in match	0	0
Best bowling	2/20	1/3
Catches/stumpings	688/61	320/34
- Source: CricInfo, 30 September 2008

Steven Andrew Marsh (born 27 January 1961), is a former English cricketer. He was a right-handed batsman and wicket-keeper, and played for Kent County Cricket Club for his entire career, between 1982 and 1999. He was appointed club captain in 1997 and continued in that role until the end of the 1998 season. He was capped by Kent in 1986.

Sporting positions
Preceded by Mark Benson	Kent County Cricket Club captain 1997–1998	Succeeded by Matthew Fleming
