= Charles Leslie (cricketer) =

English businessman and cricketer

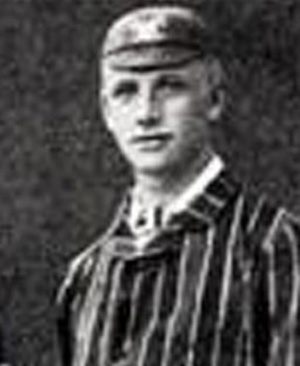

Personal information
- Born: 8 December 1861; Mayfair, Westminster, London
- Died: 12 February 1921 (aged 59); Mayfair, Westminster, London
- Batting: Right-handed
- Bowling: Right-arm fast

International information
- National side: England
- Test debut (cap 39): 30 December 1882 v Australia
- Last Test: 21 February 1883 v Australia

Career statistics
Competition	Test	First-class
Matches	4	48
Runs scored	106	1,860
Batting average	15.14	22.96
100s/50s	0/1	4/10
Top score	54	144
Balls bowled	96	332
Wickets	4	8
Bowling average	11.00	20.62
5 wickets in innings	0	0
10 wickets in match	0	0
Best bowling	3/31	3/31
Catches/stumpings	0/–	18/–
- Source: CricketArchive, 6 November 2022

Charles Frederick Henry Leslie (8 December 1861 – 12 February 1921) was an English businessman and cricketer. He played first-class cricket for eight years between 1881 and 1888, for Oxford University, Middlesex and England.

== Life ==
He was the son of Henry David Leslie and his wife, Mary Betsy Perry. At Rugby School he was captain of cricket, and according to one opinion was, with Charles Thomas Studd of Eton, the best public school all-rounder of the year. He was compared favourably to Manley Kemp, cricket captain of Harrow School.

Leslie matriculated at Oriel College, Oxford, in 1880. He became managing director of William France, Fenwick &. Co. Ltd., Fenchurch Street, London, coal merchants and ship owners, a company formed in 1901 when three shipping companies merged. They shipped mainly coal, and Baltic timber. As a director of Baku Russian Petroleum, he visited Baku in 1904, and struck up a friendship with the entrepreneur Leslie Urquhart.

After the 1905 Russian Revolution and subsequent depression, Leslie went into business with Urquhart, investing in Russian oil and minerals. At board level, the existing Anglo-Siberian group was reconfigured as the Perm Corporation, including Sir Frederick Frankland of East Russian mines and the civil engineer Thomas Blair Reynolds (1860–1941), as well as Leslie and Urquhart.

In 1908 Leslie became Chairman of the Kyshtym Corporation, for mining, with Semmy Joseph Blumlein (1863–1914) as managing director. By 1912, in a complex corporate struggle, Leslie had broken with Urquhart. The Fenchurch group of investors were excluded from further developments by Urquhart, who had joined forces with American interests, for whom Alfred Chester Beatty and Herbert Hoover were acting.

By 1905, Leslie resided at Epcombs, near Hertingfordbury in Hertfordshire.

=== Cricketing career ===
Leslie was a hard-hitting batsman with a solid defence, a useful right-arm fast bowler and an athletic cover-point. He won blues for cricket in each of his three seasons at Oxford (1881–83) and also at racquets and football.

His performances won him selection for the Honourable Ivo Bligh's tour side to Australia in 1882/3 where he was part of the team that regained the Ashes. His Test career comprised all four matches for Bligh's team when he scored 106 runs at 15.14 and took four wickets at 11.00. The first three matches were played against Billy Murdoch's 1882 touring team and counted for the Ashes; Leslie did not take a wicket in the last two of those Tests. The urn was not at stake for the fourth match played against a combined Australian side when Leslie took one first innings wicket.

Leslie represented Middlesex from 1881 to 1886 and in 48 first-class matches in total scored 1860 runs at 22.96 with his 144 for Bligh's XI against New South Wales the highest of his four hundreds. He took eight wickets at 20.62 and held 18 catches.

Below first-class level Leslie played county level cricket for Shropshire between 1878 and 1891, achieving a century in one match where he made 164 runs. He played during that time at club level for Oswestry.

== Family ==
His son, John, also played first-class cricket. Leslie's great-grandson is the former Kent and England cricketer Matthew Fleming. His great-great-grandson is actor Jack Huston.

Leslie died in February 1921 aged 59.
