= Matthew Fleming =

English cricketer

Personal information
- Full name: Matthew Valentine Fleming
- Born: 12 December 1964 (age 61); Macclesfield, Cheshire, England
- Batting: Right-handed
- Bowling: Right arm medium
- Role: All-rounder
- Relatives: Charles Leslie (great-grandfather)

International information
- National side: England
- ODI debut (cap 148): 11 December 1997 v India
- Last ODI: 24 May 1998 v South Africa

Domestic team information
- Years: Team
- 1988–2002: Kent

Career statistics
Competition	ODI	FC	LA
Matches	11	219	314
Runs scored	139	9,206	6,161
Batting average	15.44	30.18	24.74
100s/50s	0/0	11/42	4/28
Top score	33	138	138
Balls bowled	523	22,292	12,299
Wickets	17	290	377
Bowling average	25.52	35.91	25.71
5 wickets in innings	0	2	3
10 wickets in match	0	0	0
Best bowling	4/45	5/51	5/27
Catches/stumpings	1/–	83/–	81/–
- Source: Cricinfo, 21 March 2009

Matthew Valentine Fleming (born 12 December 1964) is a former British Army officer and professional cricketer who represented Kent County Cricket Club and the England cricket team. He was President of Marylebone Cricket Club (MCC) from 2016 to 2017.

== Background and early life ==
Fleming's great-grandfather was Charles Leslie, who played cricket for England and Middlesex in the 1880s. Fleming is also great-nephew of Ian Fleming, popularly known as the creator of James Bond.

Fleming was educated at Eton College. After leaving school, in 1985 he joined the Royal Green Jackets as an officer, serving in Northern Ireland, Hong Kong and Germany.

== Cricket career ==
Whilst in the army, Fleming captained the British Army cricket team. He became a professional cricketer after leaving the army and played from 1989 until 2002. His first two scoring shots in first-class cricket were sixes and he excelled as a cover-point fielder, and his.

Fleming played for Kent for 13 years, scoring 9,206 runs and captaining the county for four years. He played 11 One Day Internationals for England, and won the Champions Trophy in Sharjah in 1997.

Fleming was Chairman of the Professional Cricketers Association and in 2016–17 served as President of the Marylebone Cricket Club.

== Later career ==
Fleming is a partner in Stonehage Fleming, a wealth advisory company. He has been Managing Partner of Fleming Media and a Director of Ian Fleming Publications and James Bond Enterprises.

Sporting positions
Preceded by Steve Marsh	Kent County Cricket Club captain 1999–2001	Succeeded by David Fulton
