= Kharitonov Palace =

Historical building in Yekaterinburg, Russia

Coordinates: 56°50′43″N 60°36′40″E

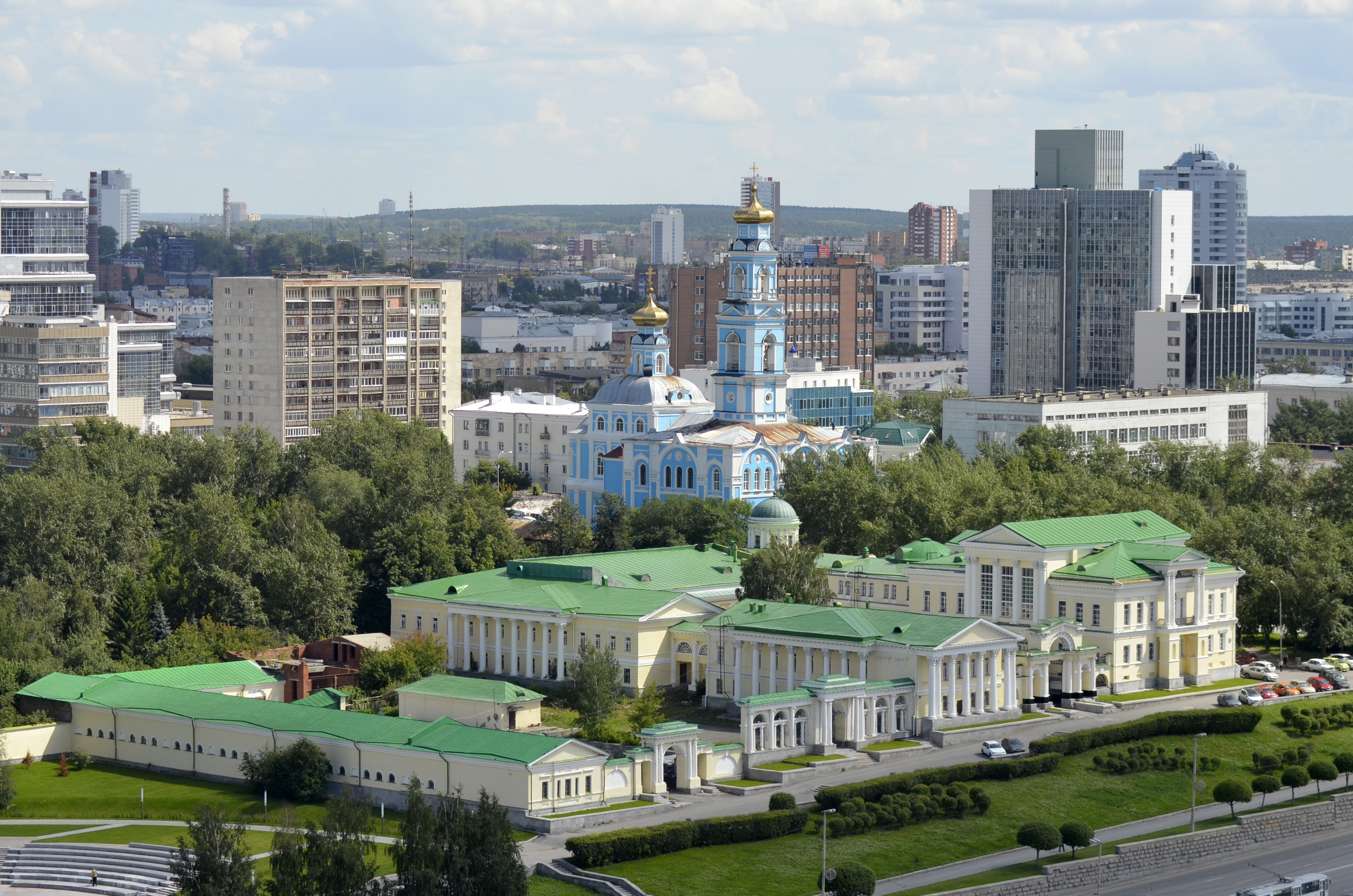
Alexander I of Russia visited the Kharitonov Palace in 1824.

The Rastorguyev–Kharitonov Palace (Russian: Усадьба Расторгуевых–Харитоновых) is a palace in Yekaterinburg, Russia, an architectural monument of federal significance. This Neoclassical townhouse was commissioned in 1794 by Lev Rastorguyev, an Old Believer merchant and landowner. The main house was built on the so-called Annunciation Hill in Yekaterinburg. The nearby Annunciation Church was built at the same time.

== History ==
The palace takes its present name from Pyotr Kharitonov, Rastorguyev's son-in-law. He inherited the property in 1824 and employed architect Mikhail Pavlovich Malakhov to connect the buildings with a series of covered passageways. An English park on the grounds was also commissioned by Kharitonov. His harsh treatment of the serfs gave rise to a bevy of legends about a network of underground chambers and passages where his peasants were tortured.

In 1837 Kharitonov was officially censured for his cruelty, put on trial and condemned to life imprisonment in Kexholm Fortress. The palace fell into disuse.

It was repaired in Soviet Time in the late 1930s to house a local Pioneers Palace. In 1935-1937 major repairs were carried out here. After USSR and pioneers system fall, it continued to function as children's art school.

Pyotr Latyshev, the Presidential Envoy to Urals Federal District, planned to take over the palace in 2000. Corresponding Presidential Decree was issued. But protests of art school children's parents sparkled, one of them—politician Anton Bakov—appealed to Supreme Court and later Constitutional Court where he won. Local political tensions also took place, they were later described in a 2014 documentary novel "Eburg" by writer Alexei Ivanov.

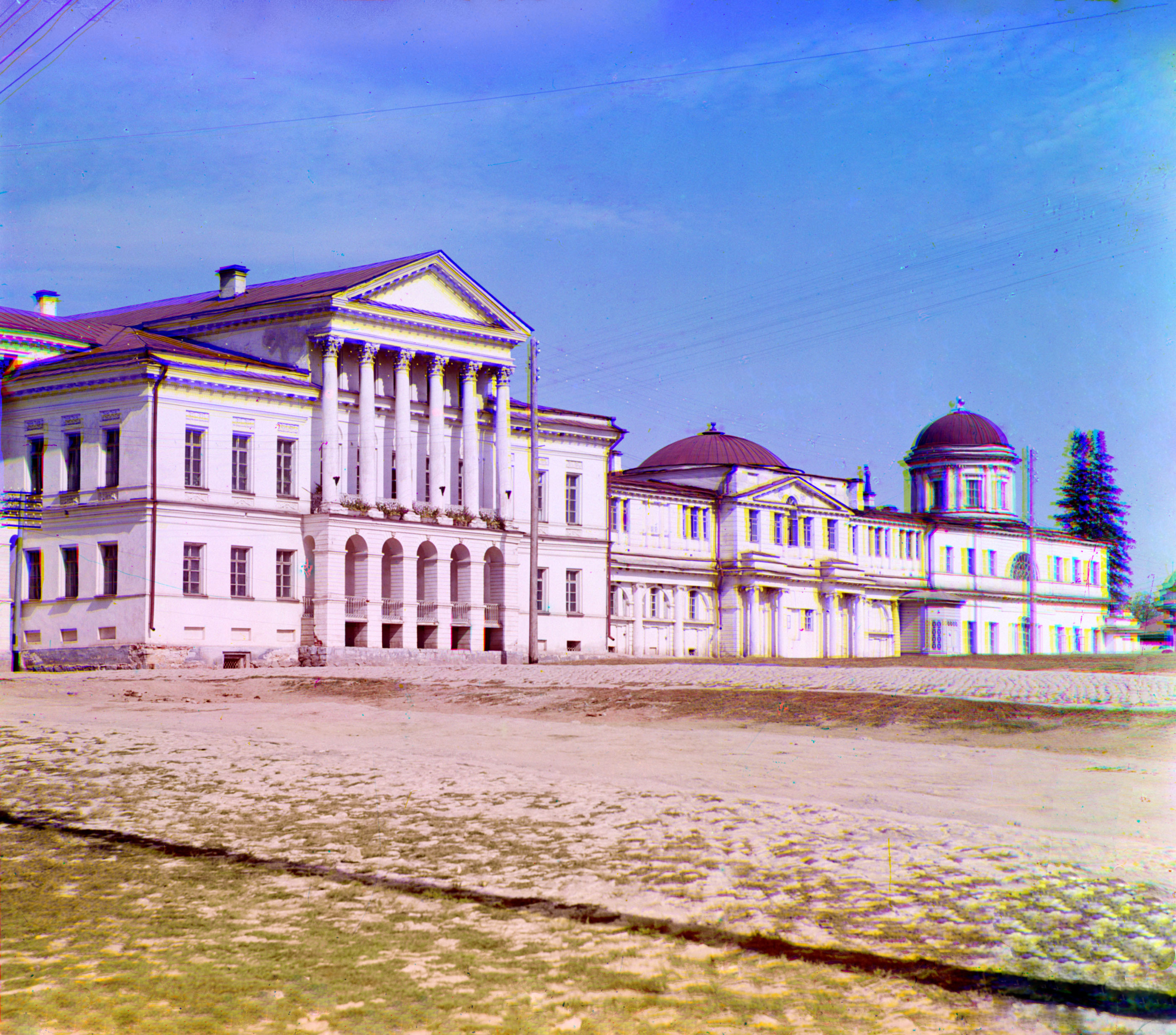
A Prokudin-Gorsky photograph, 1910s

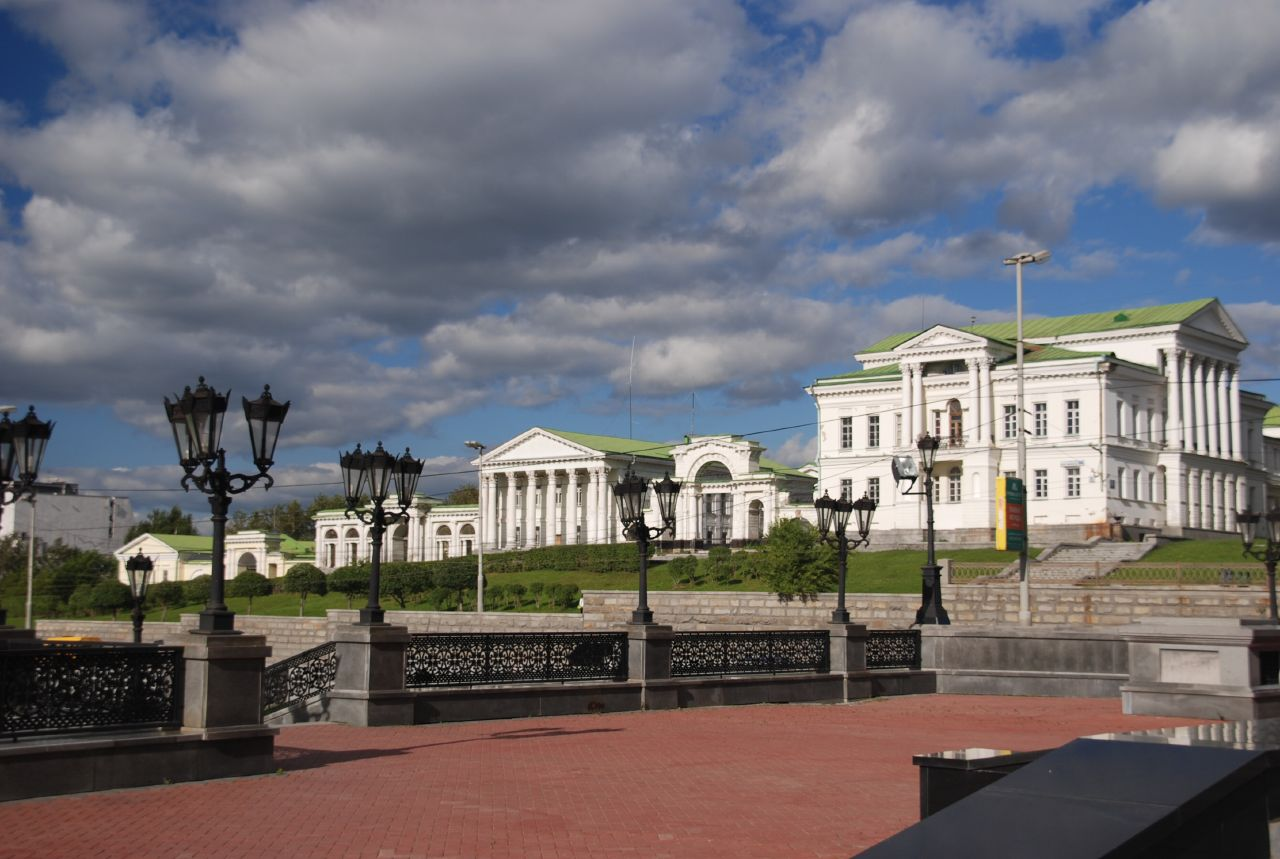
The palace compound in the 2000s

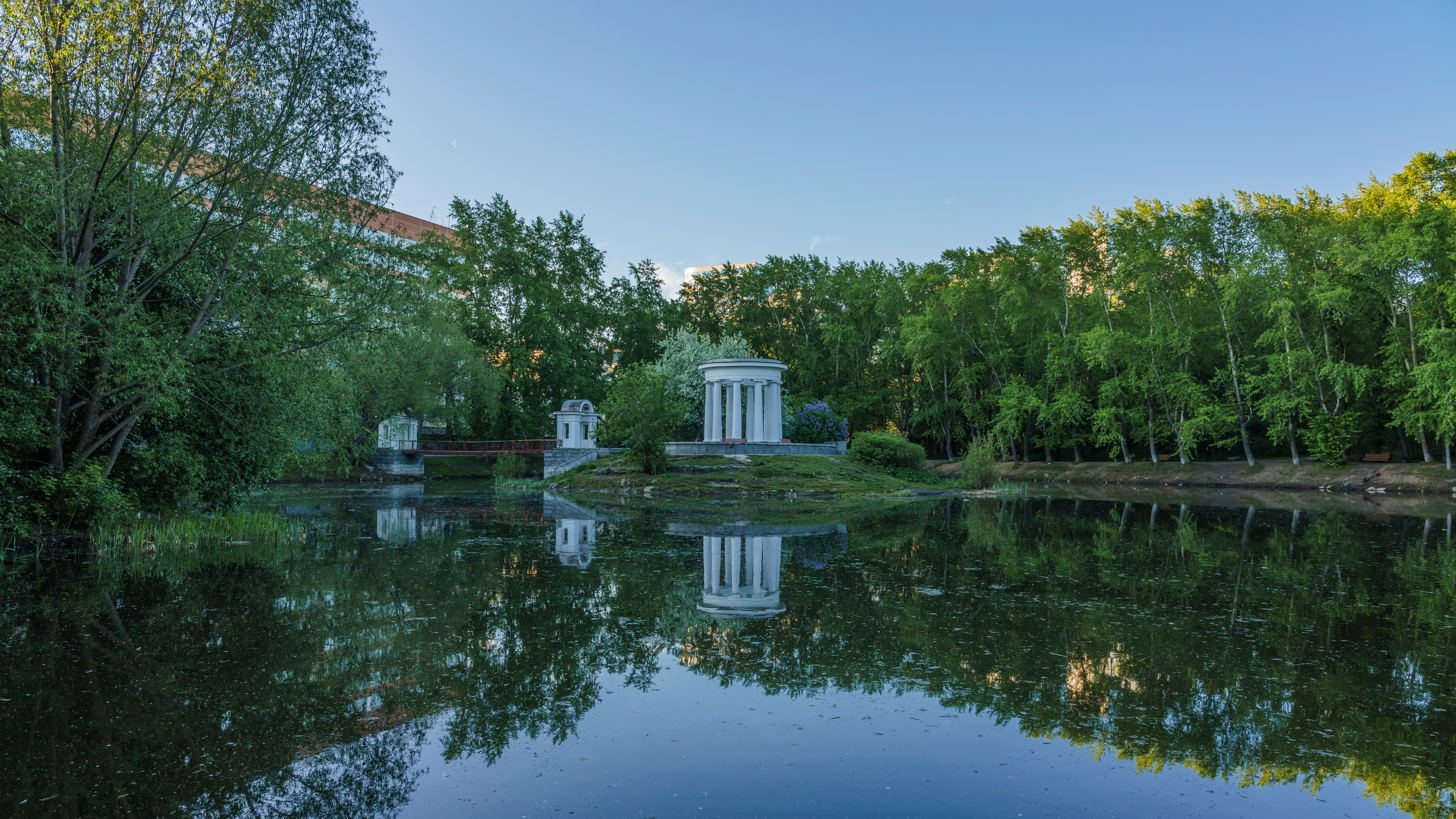
The Kharitonov Gardens
