= Hubert Pilkington =

English cricketer

Hubert Carlisle Pilkington (23 October 1879 – 17 June 1942) was an English first-class cricketer active 1899–1904 who played for Middlesex and Oxford University. He was born in Liverpool, educated at Eton College and Magdalen College, Oxford, and died in Letchworth.
