= Henry David Leslie =

English composer and conductor (1822–1896)

Leslie in later years

Henry David Leslie (18 June 1822 – 5 February 1896) was an English composer and conductor. Leslie was a leader in supporting amateur choral musicians in Britain, founding prize-winning amateur choral societies. He was also a supporter of musical higher education, helping to found national music schools.

== Biography ==
Leslie was born in London. His parents were John Leslie, a tailor and enthusiastic amateur viola player, and Mary Taylor Leslie. He had eight brothers and sisters. He attended the Palace School in Enfield and worked with his father. As a teenager, he studied the cello with Charles Lucas and later played that instrument in concerts at the Sacred Harmonic Society for several years.

=== Early career ===
Leslie began to compose music, and in 1840 he published his Te Deum and Jubilate in D. He became honorary secretary of the newly founded Amateur Musical Society in 1847. His symphony in F was performed in 1848 by the Amateur Musical Society under Michael Balfe. The next year, at the Norwich music festival of 1849, his much-admired anthem "Let God Arise" was premiered. He conducted the Amateur Musical Society from 1853 until it dissolved in 1861.

Leslie's dramatic overture, The Templar (1852), was followed by and his well-regarded oratorios Immanuel (1854) and Judith (1858), and some chamber music. In 1855, he founded a madrigal society which grew to 200 voices and became known as Henry Leslie's Choir. He was its conductor until 1880. The choir introduced many important choral works to English audiences, including J. S. Bach's motets. According to The Times, this choir "held the palm among London societies for finished singing of unaccompanied music, both ancient and modern".

In 1857, Leslie married Mary Betsy, one of his pupils, the daughter of physician William Henry Perry. The couple moved to Mary's family home, now known as Bryn Tanat Hall, at Llansanffraid, near Oswestry on the Welsh border. They produced four sons and one daughter. Their son William became a master of the Musicians' Company, and Charles became a cricketer for Middlesex and England.

Leslie's operetta Romance, or, Bold Dick Turpin, first performed in 1857, was presented at Covent Garden in 1860. After this, he wrote the cantatas Holyrood (1860) and Daughter of the Isles (1861) and a Jubilate in B (1864). In 1865, he wrote a romantic opera Ida, or, The Guardian Storks. He also conducted the amateur Herefordshire Philharmonic Society from 1863. He published over a hundred part songs for the choir. Some of these became very popular, including the trio "O memory", "The Pilgrims", and "Annabelle Lee" set to a poem by Edgar Allan Poe. His output also included a quantity of chamber and piano music. He also edited collections of part songs, including Cassell's Choral Music, in 1867.

=== Later years ===
In 1864, Leslie established a National College of Music, in Piccadilly, and acted as its principal. Its professors included Arthur Sullivan, Julius Benedict, and other prominent musicians, but the college survived only two years. In 1874, he became conductor of the newly formed Guild of Amateur Musicians. In 1878, Leslie and others made another attempt to form a national music school, which was successful and became the predecessor of the Royal College of Music.

Leslie and Sullivan organised the British musical presentations at the Paris Exhibition of 1878. There Henry Leslie's Choir won the first prize at the international choral competition. In 1880, after a royal command performance at Windsor Castle, he dissolved the choir. Later, however, it was re-formed under Alberto Randegger, with Leslie as president, and he resumed conducting it from 1885 to 1887. Charles Santley and other well-known soloists performed with the choir.

Leslie's only major composition later in life was his second symphony, Chivalry, which premiered in 1881 at The Crystal Palace. After he retired, he founded the Oswestry School of Music and its Festival of Village Choirs. At the end of his life, Leslie was ill for several years.

He died in 1896 in Baschurch, Shropshire, and was buried in the churchyard at Llanyblodwel.
