= Mikhail Malakhov (architect) =

Russian neoclassicist architect

Mikhail Pavlovich Malakhov (Russian: Михаил Павлович Малахов; 1781, Chernigov Governorate, Russian Empire, now Ukraine – 1842, Yekaterinburg, Russian Empire, now Russia ) was a Russian architect who graduated from the Imperial Academy of Arts in 1802 and was active primarily in Yekaterinburg. He was responsible for many Neoclassical buildings in the Urals, including private residences (such as Kharitonov Palace and Kyshtym Manor House) and churches (Alexander Nevsky Cathedral in Yekaterinburg, Trinity Cathedral in Kamensk-Uralsky).

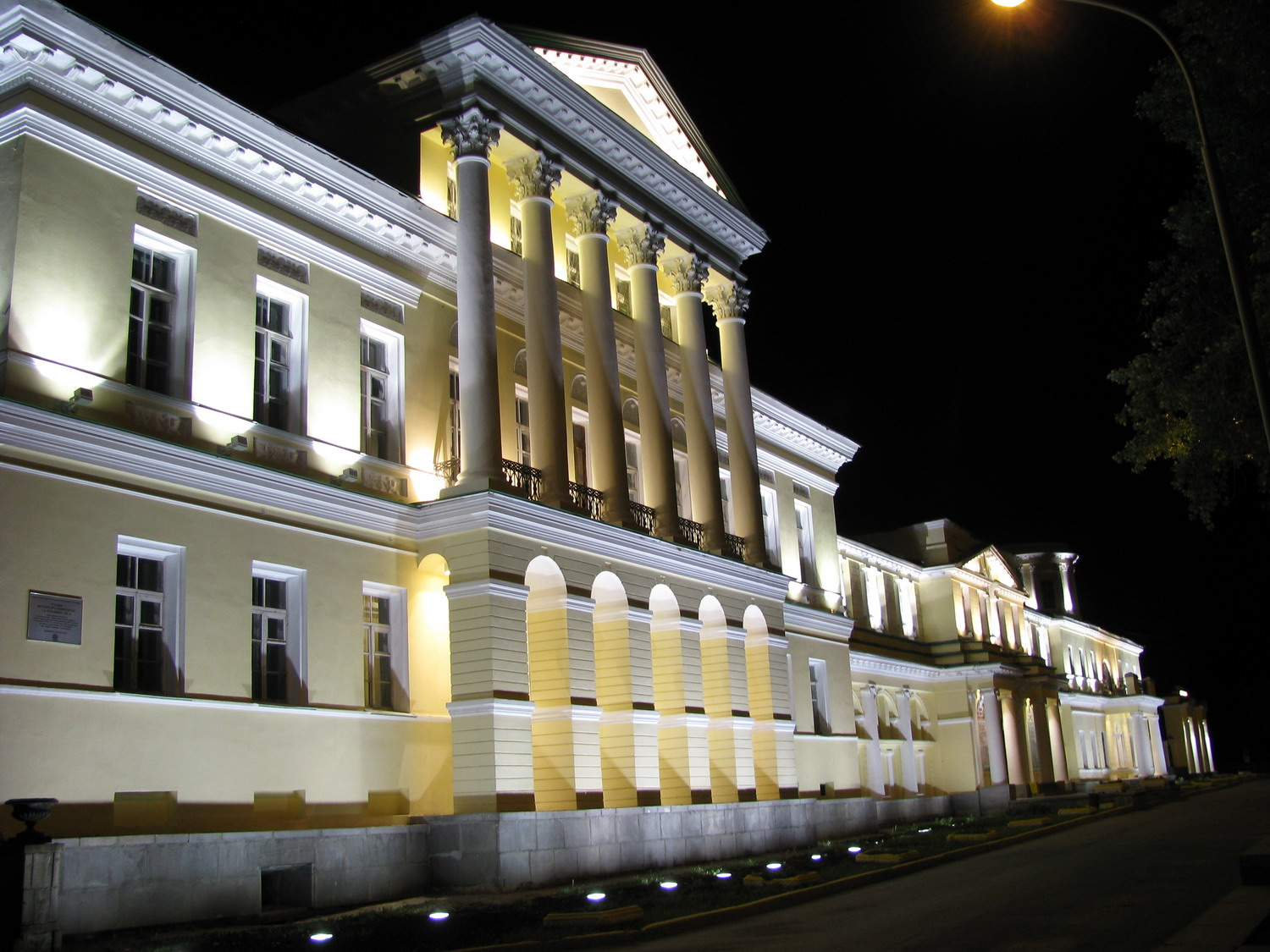
Kharitonov Palace, Yekaterinburg

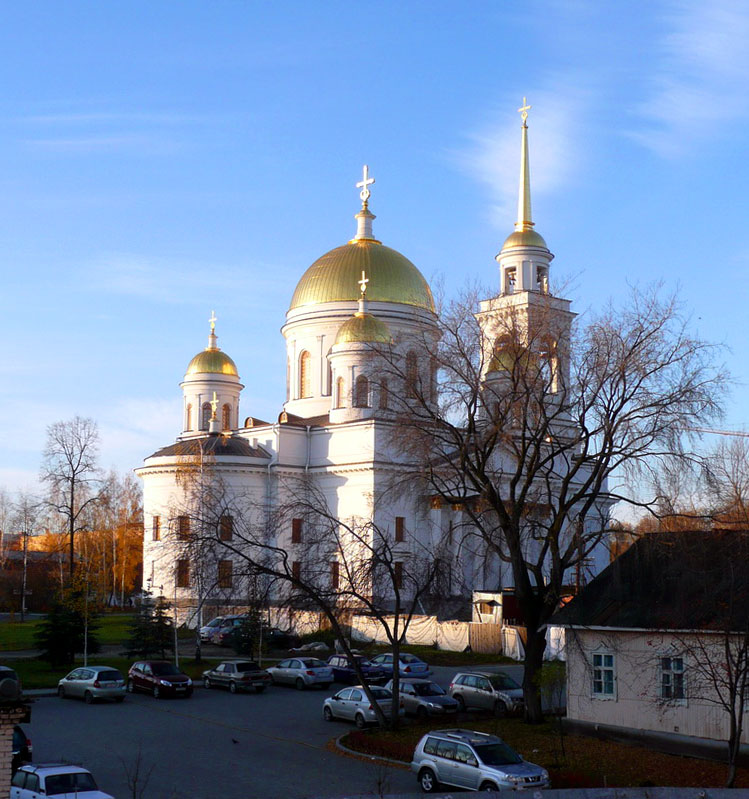
Alexander Nevsky Cathedral, Yekaterinburg

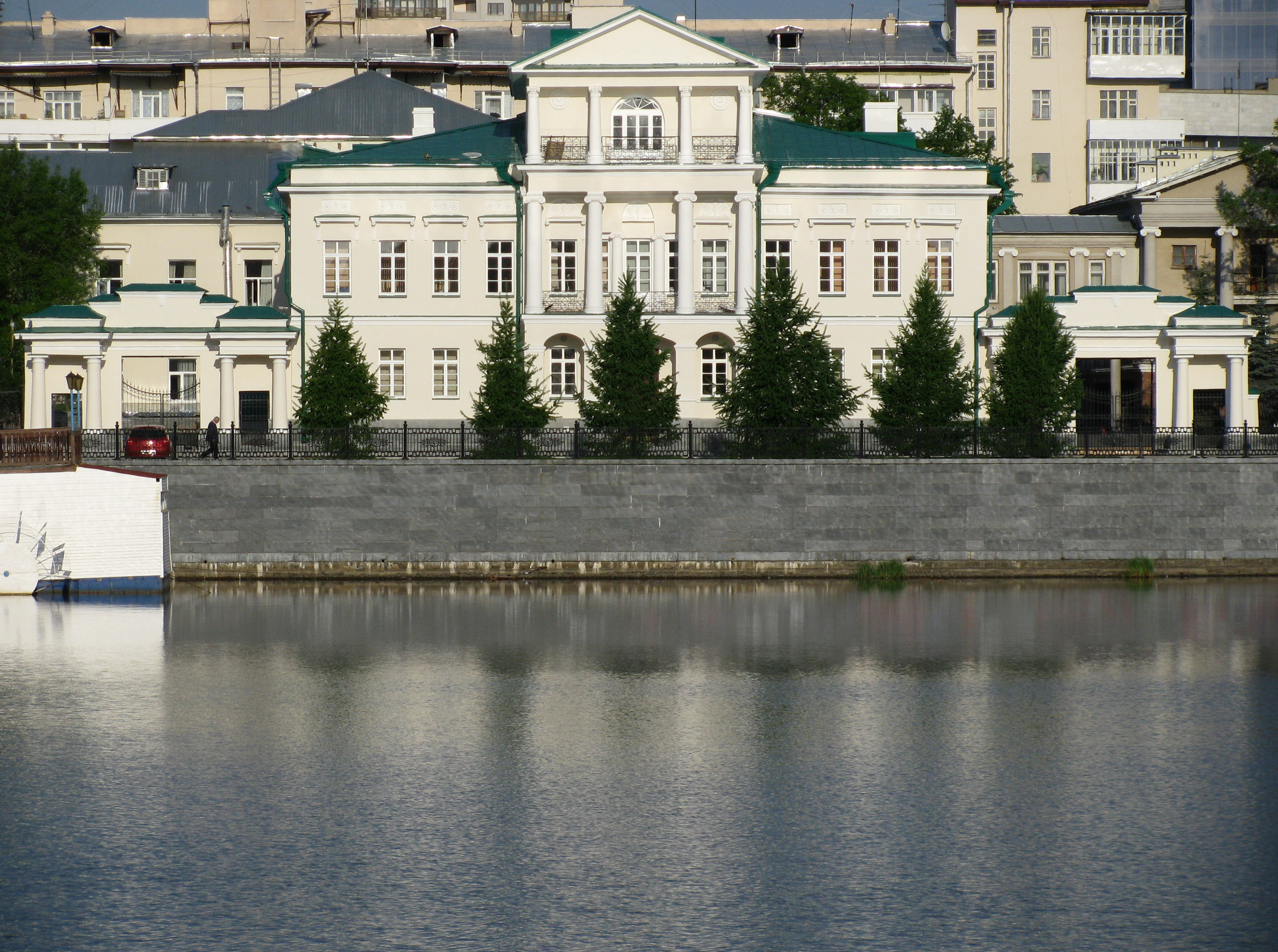
The Mining Director's House, Yekaterinburg

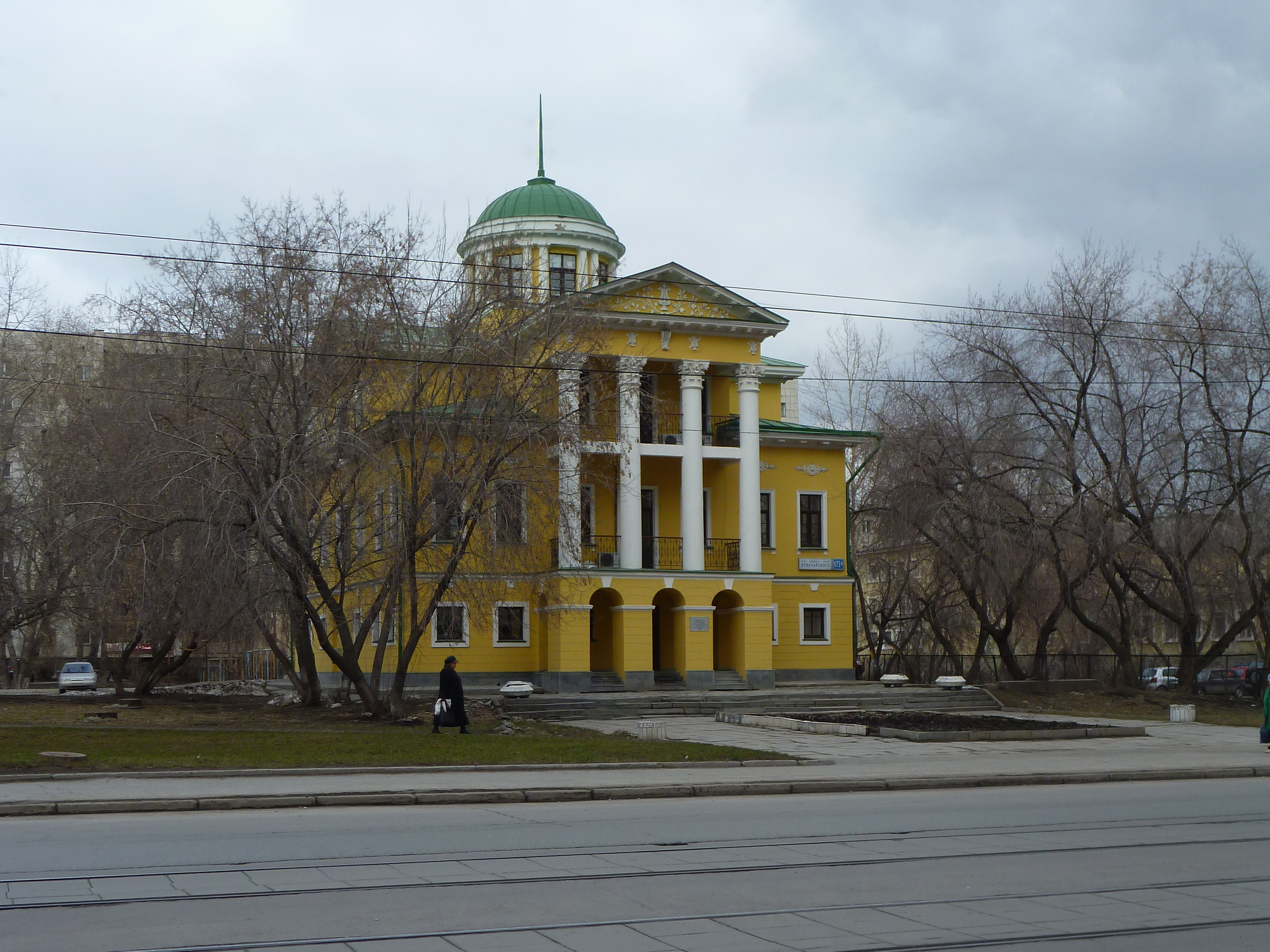
Malakhov Dacha near Yekaterinburg

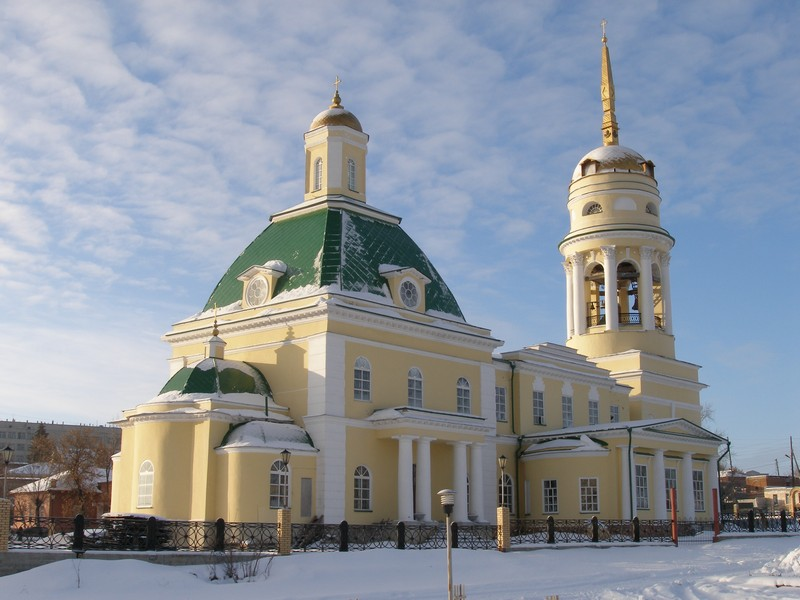
The Trinity church of the Kamensk Plant

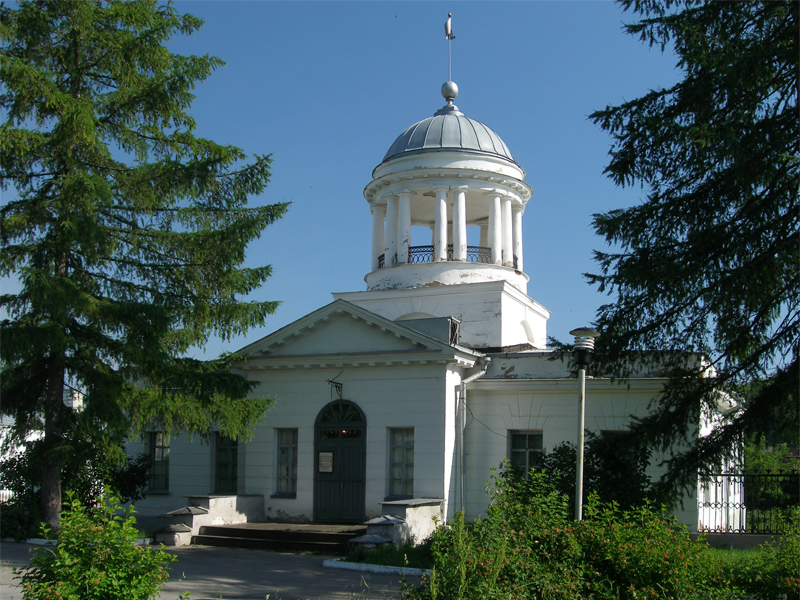
The head office of the Kamensk Plant
