= Geologichesky =

Geologichesky (masculine), Geologicheskaya (feminine), or Geologicheskoye (neuter) may refer to:

- Geologichesky (settlement), a settlement in Tomsk Oblast, Russia
- Geologicheskaya, a station of the Yekaterinburg Metro, Yekaterinburg, Russia
