= Botanicheskaya =

Yekaterinburg Metro station

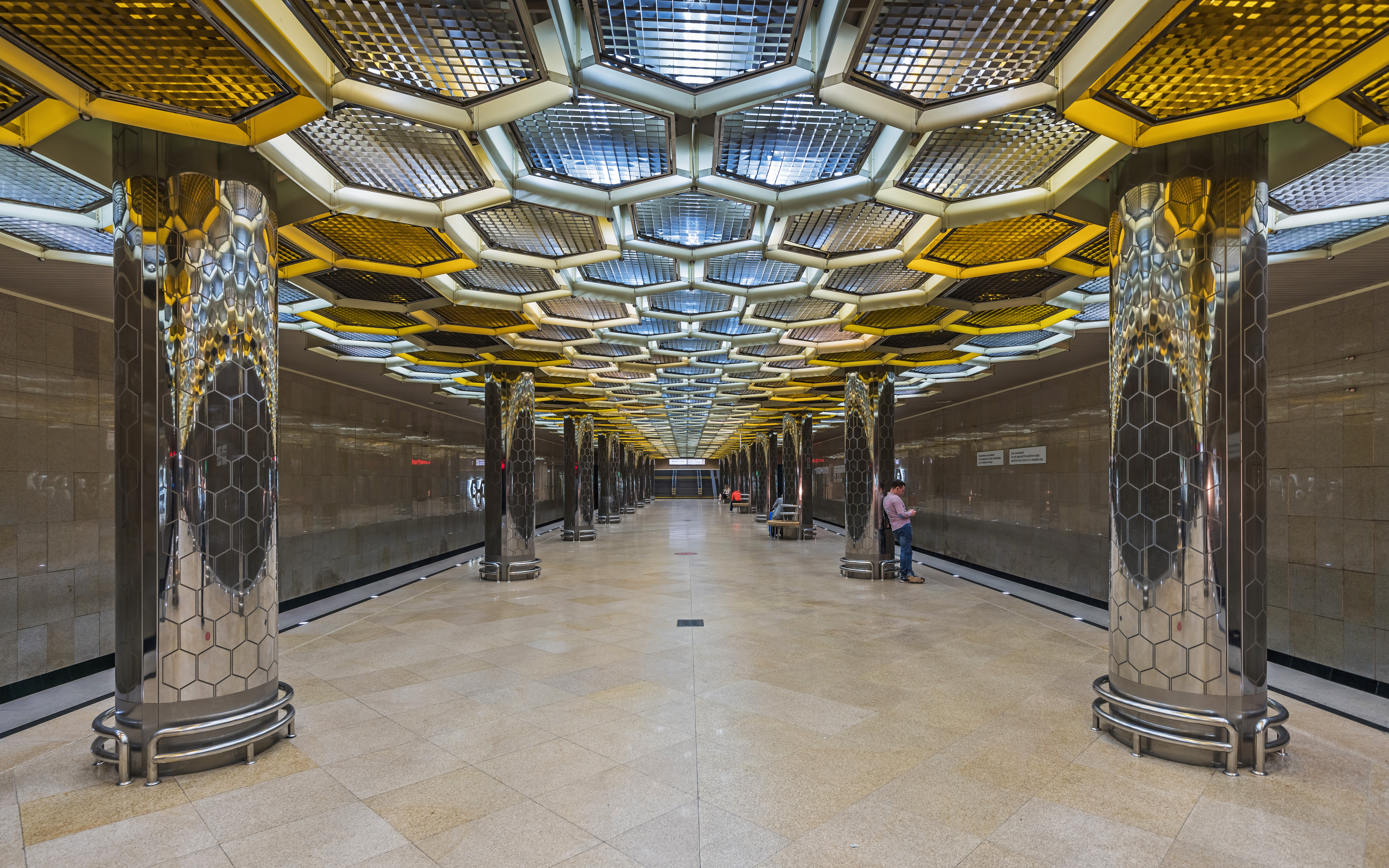

General information
- Coordinates: 56.797778°N 60.630833°E
- System: Yekaterinburg Metro
- Line: First line
- Platforms: 1
- Tracks: 2

Construction
- Structure type: Island

History
- Opened: 2011-11-28

Services
Preceding station	Yekaterinburg Metro	Following station
Chkalovskaya towards Prospekt Kosmonavtov	First Line	Terminus
Route map
Location

Botanicheskaya (Russian: Ботаническая) is a station of the Yekaterinburg Metro which was opened on November 28, 2011. The station is unique because the roof design is based on honeycombs representing the city's botanical gardens. It is also named after the nearby Botanical Garden of the Ural Branch of the Russian Academy of Sciences and the adjacent Botanichesky residential area.

This terminal station of the 1st line is located in the Chkalovsky district of Yekaterinburg. It is between the existing station "Chkalovskaya" and the anticipated "Uktusskie Gory" (Utusskie Mountains Station).

== Construction history ==
The station was in the original project of the Sverdlovsk Metro as "Belinskaya."

- March 27, 2007 — construction of the station began.
- August 21, 2007 — work on communications is completed, temporary buildings have been erected, electricity has been supplied, pile barriers have been completed.
- December 21, 2007 — the builders poured the first cubic meters of concrete into the pit of the future station.
- April 9, 2008 — work continues on the concrete pouring of the train exit and turn-around chamber. Builders poured over 2 thousand cubic meters of concrete into the frame of the turning platform.
- September 5, 2008 — "WIRTH (tunnel boring machine)" went out from the left running tunnel into the station pit; one third of the base of the station is completed.
- February 6, 2009 — the bulk of concrete work is completed. All major work on the construction of the station building will be completed by September 2009, after which finishing work will begin at the station.
- February 25, 2010 — the tunneling complex "WIRTH" was re-launched to drill 1370 m of the right running tunnel back towards "Chkalovskaya."
- March 12, 2010 — in 2 weeks of work "WIRTH" passed the first 25 meters of the right running tunnel, after March 15, work is carried out in 2 shifts.
- May 16, 2010 — "WIRTH" has already passed 230 meters of the right running tunnel, according to the agreed schedule. Monolithic works are in full swing at the station, which will be completed by the end of 2010.
- January 12, 2011 — all that remains to pass is 400 meters of the tunnel, tunneling will be completed by April 2011, the main construction and installation work at Botanicheskaya is 99% completed, specialized and finishing work is underway.
- March 12, 2011 — the tunneling complex "WIRTH" has 150 meters to go; average penetration rate – 6 meters per day.
- April 20, 2011 — a breakthrough took place, completing the driving of the right running tunnel.
- May 25, 2011 — the lobbies and staircases to the platform are completely tiled with granite tiles, the track walls are being finished with light beige granite. A traction station is installed; work on the pouring of track concrete and the installation of rail lines is done. Three of the pedestrian crossings are ready for finishing and the fourth is having concrete poured for its frame.
- October 11, 2011 — construction work is carried out in three shifts, all internal premises are 100% ready, pedestrian crossings are being finished (100% ready).
- November 20 and 21, 2011 — the oversize frame goes through both tunnels.
- November 28, 2011 — Russian President Dmitry Medvedev takes part in the grand opening of Botanicheskaya metro station.

== Transfers ==
Two underground lobbies are connected to the passenger platform by two-flight staircases with a rise of 3.36 m each. The southern underground lobby is combined with a long underground pedestrian walkway, which has 7 ground entrances. Two entrances are on the south side of Shvartsa Street at the intersection with Krestinsky Street (on both sides of Krestinsky St.). There is another entrance on the northern side of the street (near house number 232 on Belinsky street). There are four entrances at the intersection of Shvartsa and Belinsky (one at each corner of the intersection), these did not open simultaneously with the station due to their unavailability. They were opened the next day – November 29. Special ramps are provided on staircases.

The northern vestibule of the station has one entrance – opposite the shopping center "Dirizhable," from the side of Belinsky Street. In the future, an underground passage will be laid under Fuchik Street, on the north side of which there will be another entrance.

There are two dead ends behind the station and an intersection between them.

== Technical specifications ==
- Station Construction – triple-span shallow column station with two rows of columns.
- Depth of the foundation – 12 meters.
- Column spacing – 6 мeters.
- Distance between tracks – 12.9 meters.

== Design ==
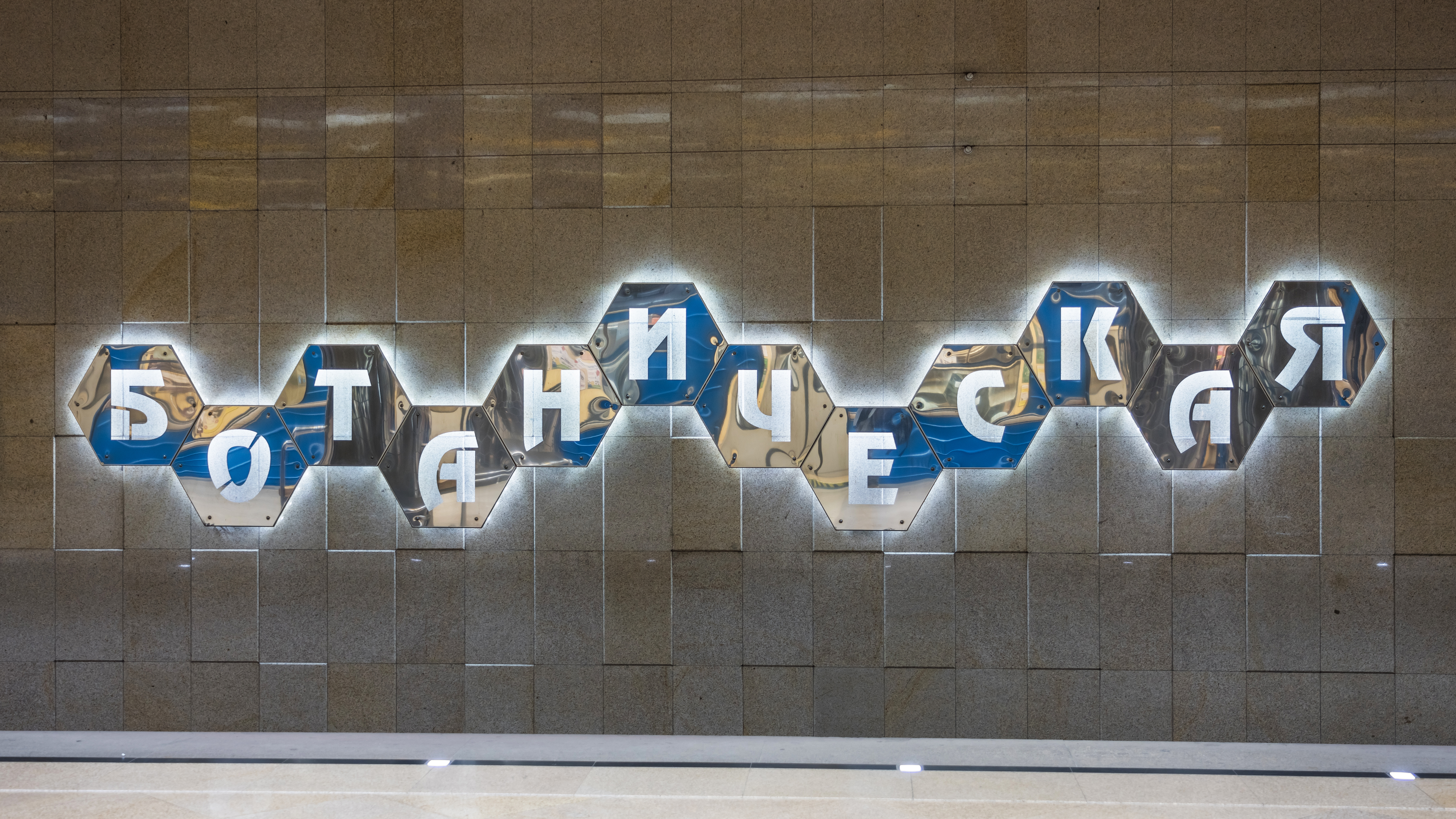
Station name on the track wall

Hexagons associated with honeycombs are a key element in the design of the station. The honeycomb-shaped ceiling makes it possible to successfully hide lamps inside it, and this provides a soft, warm illumination of the platform below. The light-colored floor is made of porcelain stoneware, the columns are covered with sheet metal.

== Passenger transportation ==
The estimated load during "rush hour" is 9.35 thousand people for landing and 4.65 thousand people for disembarkation. The average daily traffic volume is 50 thousand passengers, and the annual – 18.3 million passengers.

== Ground public transportation ==
The station has exits to numerous stops (including the final ones) and to all types of land transport: Yekaterinburg buses, Yekaterinburg trolley buses, Yekaterinburg trams and Yekaterinburg taxi routes.

Table: public transport routes (data as of November 2015)

Buses
Route number	To metro station	End point 1	End point 2
17	"Botanicheskaya" (stop "Krestinsky street"),	South	Rudny Town
57	«Uralskaya» («Vokzalnaya» stop), «Ploshchad 1905 Goda», «Geologicheskaya» («Tsirk» stop), «Chkalovskaya» («Avtovokzal» stop), «Botanicheskaya» («Krestinsky street» stop)	Pekhotintsev street	Yelizavet

Trams
Route number	To metro station	End point 1	End point 2
5	«Uralmash (Yekaterinburg Metro)», «Mashinostroiteley» («Peduniversitet» stop), «Uralskaya» («Zh.D. Vokzal» stop ), «Geologicheskaya» («Tsirk» stop), «Chkalovskaya» («Avtovokzal» stop), «Botanicheskaya»	UZTM (Uralmash factory)	Metro station «Botanicheskaya»
34	«Botanicheskaya»	Metro station «Botanicheskaya»	Keramicheskaya

Trolleybuses
Route number	To metro station	End point 1	End point 2
1	«Uralskaya» ("Zh.D. Vokzal" stop), «Botanicheskaya» («Shvartsa Street» stop)	Zh.D. Vokzal	Himmash
6	«Botanicheskaya» («Shvartsa Street» stop)	Akademicheskaya	Himmash
9	«Uralskaya» ("Zh.D. Vokzal" stop), «Botanicheskaya» («Shvartsa Street» stop)	Zh.D. Vokzal	"Alvis" tobacco factory
15	«Uralskaya» ("Hotel Sverdlovsk" stop), «Botanicheskaya» («Krestinsky Street» и «Shvartsa Street» stops)	Hotel Sverdlovsk	microdistrict Botanichesky
20	«Botanicheskaya» («Krestinsky Street» и «Shvartsa Street» stops)	Akademicheskaya	microdistrict Botanichesky
