= Chkalovskaya (Yekaterinburg Metro) =

Metro station in Yekaterinburg, Russia

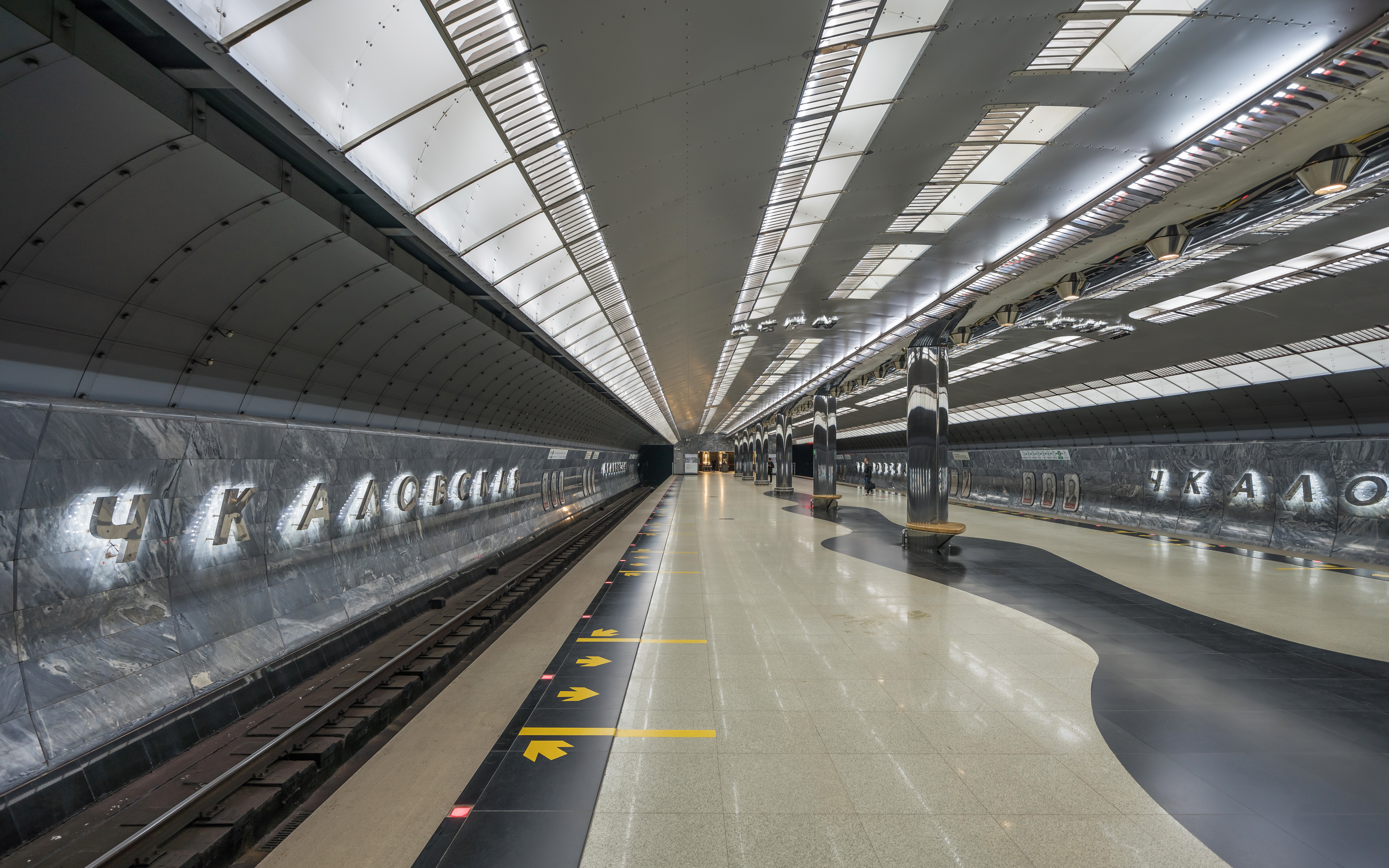

General information
- Coordinates: 56°48′30″N 60°36′37″E
- System: Yekaterinburg Metro
- Line: First line
- Platforms: 1
- Tracks: 2

History
- Opened: 2012-07-28

Services
Preceding station	Yekaterinburg Metro	Following station
Geologicheskaya towards Prospekt Kosmonavtov	First Line	Botanicheskaya Terminus
Route map
Location

Chkalovskaya (Russian: Чкаловская) is a station of the Yekaterinburg Metro which was opened on July 28, 2012. It is the eighth station on the first line of the Yekaterinburg Metro. Chkalovskaya Station is named after the region with the same name.

== Construction history ==
- November 1992 — surface site development began.
- December 1998 — the tunneling complex "WIRTH" reaches the station "Chkalovskaya."
- July 1999 — after a metro builders strike, work on the construction of the station was suspended.
- January 10, 2003 — the head of Yekaterinburg made a decision to freeze the construction of the "Bazhovskaya" station, concentrating all efforts on the construction of "Chkalovskaya" and "Botanicheskaya," but it was again practically suspended, work in 2003–2006 was carried out at an extremely slow pace due to lack of funding.
- June 2003 — construction of the station began!
- October 2006 — tram tracks were moved at the intersection of 8 Marta and Shchorsa streets, construction of an inclined escalator station began.
- January 13, 2007 — the first arches of the station vault were mounted.
- September 2007 — city administration has announced a tender for the supply of escalators for the station, which will be purchased and delivered by the end of 2008.
- January 25, 2008 — the first rings of the station's inclined course were mounted.
- May 30, 2008 — connection of the right running tunnel between the stations "Geologicheskaya" and "Chkalovskaya."
- July 25, 2008 — the 20th ring of the station's inclined course was mounted; in total, the project provides for the installation of 64 rings with a diameter of 9.5 meters.
- July 25, 2008 — covered 60 meters of the upper vault of the station.
- December 10, 2008 — 100 of 165 meters of the station's direct arch were covered.
- February 6, 2009 — only 40 of the 165 meters of the station's direct arch remain to be completed.
- May 20, 2009 — all that remains to be covered is 15 of the 165 meters of the direct arch of the station.
- February 25, 2010 — the tunneling complex "WIRTH" was re-launched to drill 1370 meters of the right running tunnel (from "Botanicheskaya" back to the side of "Chkalovskaya," the sinking will be completed within 10 months (by November 2010).
- March 12, 2010 — in 2 weeks of work "WIRTH" passed the first 25 meters of the right running tunnel, after March 15, work is carried out in 2 shifts.
- June 16, 2010 — "WIRTH" has already passed 230 meters of the right running tunnel, according to the agreed schedule. Monolithic works are in full swing at the station, which will be completed by the end of 2010. The lobby structure is 35% complete.
- July 21, 2010 — tunneling of the Chkalovskaya metro station has been completed in full. Concrete is poured.
- January 12, 2011 — all that is left to pass is 400 meters of the tunnel, tunneling will be completed by April 2011, the main construction and installation work at Chkalovskaya is 96% completed, specialized and finishing work is already underway, escalators will be installed in March 2011.
- March 12, 2011 — the tunneling complex "WIRTH" has 150 meters to go; average penetration rate – 6 meters per day. The sinking will be completed in April 2011.
- April 20, 2011 — tunnel linking took place, completing the boring of the right-hand running tunnel.
- May 25, 2011 — the installation of the power traction substation (STP) was completed, parts of the escalators were installed, finishing work with gray-blue Ufaleysky marble tiles was done on the track walls, construction of pedestrian underground crossings continues. On June 10, 2011, finishing of the Chkalovskaya lobby will begin, and on the surface – work on the transfer of tram tracks.
- June 28, 2011 — the laying of rails is complete in the right running tunnel between the stations "Geologicheskaya" and "Chkalovskaya."
- October 10, 2011 — because parts for the escalators for the Chkalovskaya station were not delivered, movement started from Geologicheskaya to Botanicheskaya without stopping at Chkalovskaya. In connection with the above, it was decided to mount temporary stairs in the inclined tunnel "Chkalovskaya" and use them as emergency exits in case of emergency. At the beginning of October 2011, pedestrian crossings were 86% reconstructed at Chkalovskaya, the platform section was 90% finished, and the technical facilities were 95% finished.
- January 16, 2012 — three of the four parts for the station's escalators have arrived, the delivery of the fourth is delayed until the end of January.
- March 6, 2012 — work on the installation of all parts for the escalators will begin on April 27, at the same time the northern part of the underpass will be completed, June 18 is considered as a possible date for the station opening.
- April 28, 2012 — traffic at the intersection of Shchorsa and 8 Marta streets was again blocked, work began on the installation of the 4 parts for the escalators, as well as the construction of the last part of the underpass. The city administration points out that "the process should be completed by July 28, and Chkalovskaya station will be ready to receive its passengers."
- June 5, 2012 — the installation of two middle escalator belts is in progress, which should be completed by June 10, then the two outer escalator belts will be equipped. By the end of June, the builders will have completed the installation of the suspended ceiling and facing of one of the station's premises with granite. After that, a small amount of finishing work remains to be done, and the station will be ready for launch.
- July 28, 2012 — the opening of the Chkalovskaya station took place, in the presence of the new governor Evgeny Kuyvashev and the head of the Yekaterinburg city administration Alexander Yakob. The head of the metro builders Yuri Dozorets gave the key to the station to the head of the metro Vladimir Shafray, Yevgeny Kuvaishev spoke.

== Design ==
=== Passenger Hall ===
The passenger hall is located along the axis of 8 Marta Street, just south of the house number 158. The design idea for the hall is a flight by V. P. Chkalov and his team to the US through the North Pole. There are lamps in the niches of a shallow vault in the suspended decorative ceiling to resemble an airplane wing. On the front wall there are 4 clocks in the style of on-board instruments with standard time: Moscow, Arkhangelsk, Vancouver, and Washington, D.C. The track walls are reminiscent of a fuselage from the inside. On May 18, 2012, portraits of pilots were added, Heroes of the Soviet Union: Valery Chkalov, Georgy Baydukov and Alexandra Belyakov. On the dark walls, places for advertising are styled as portholes of an airplane. There are lanterns in the floor along the safety line that light up with a creeping line when a train approaches. In the passenger hall there is a row of 9 stainless steel mirrored columns along the axis of the hall. The color scheme is steel gray and bluish.

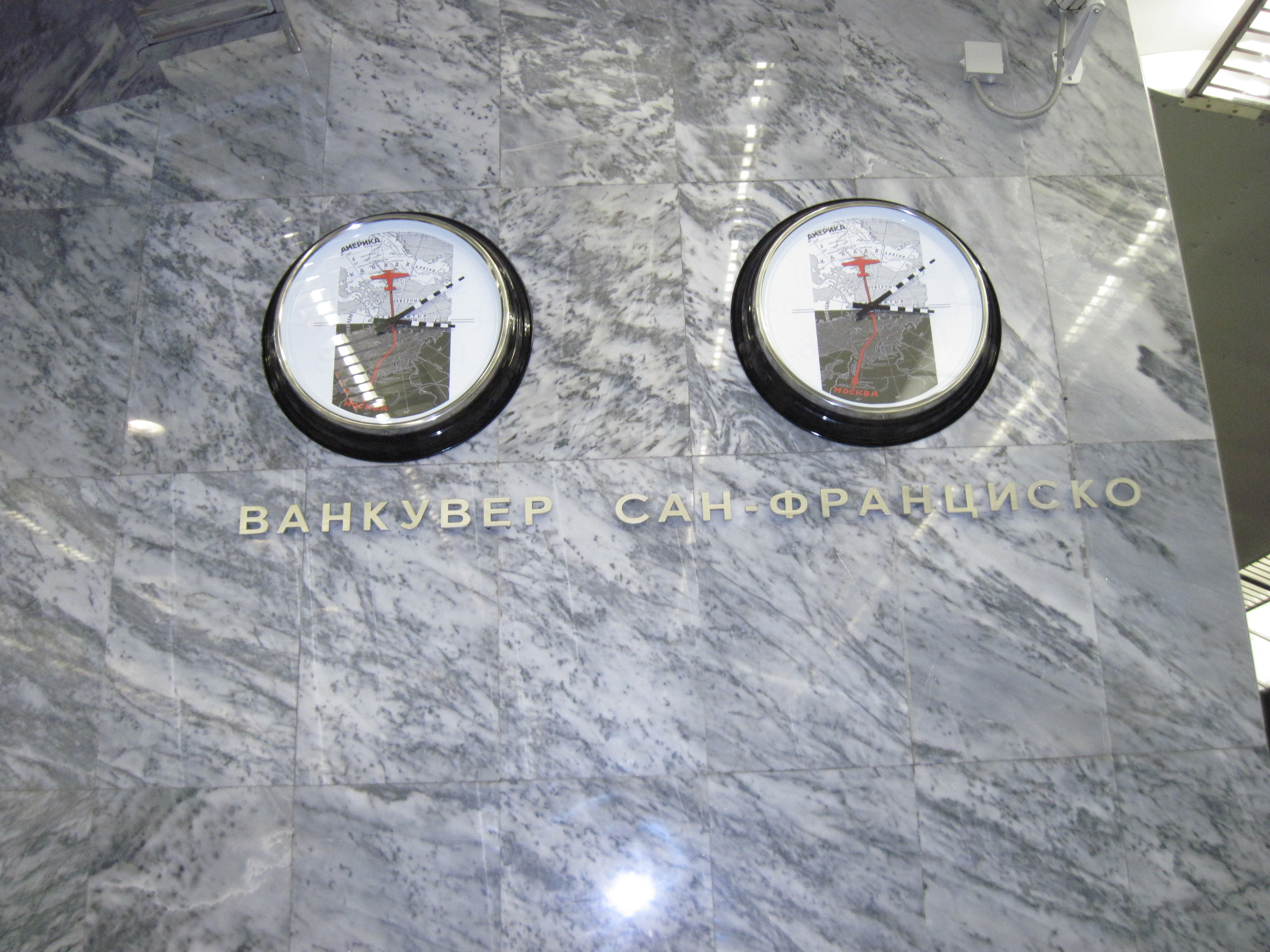
Clocks, which show the time in Vancouver and San francisco according to the design of the station.

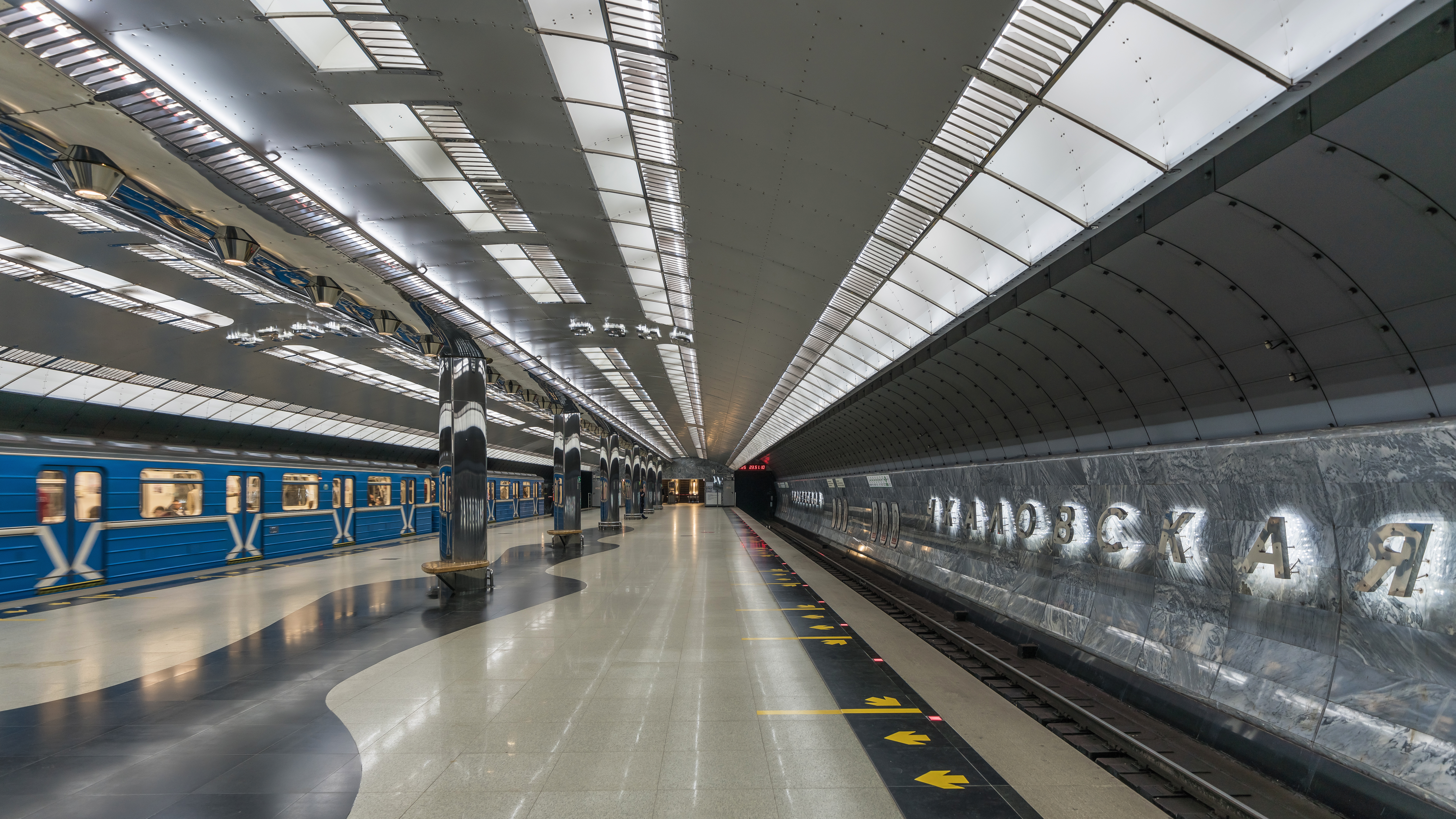
Train at the station

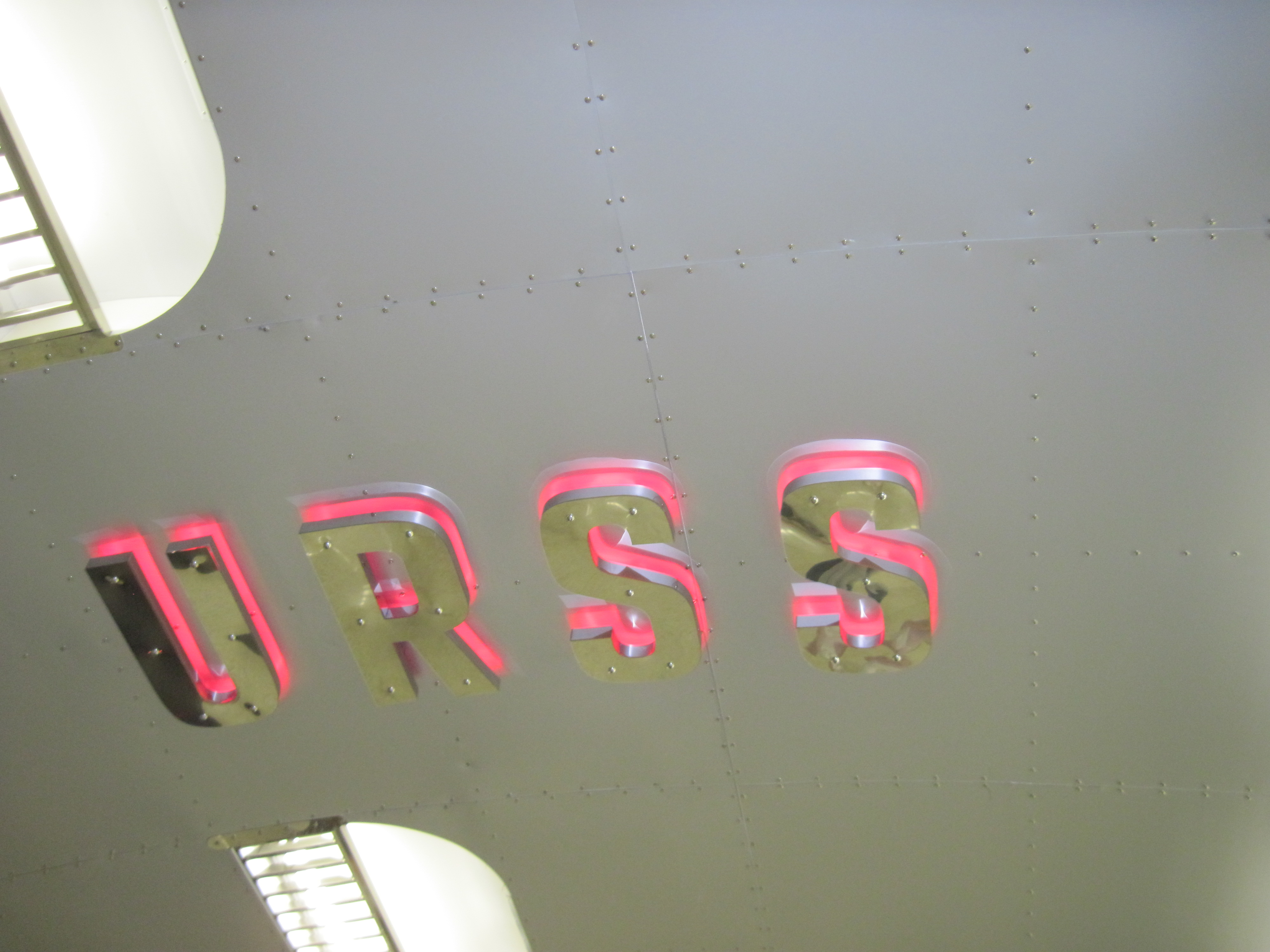
Part of the inscription on the ceiling

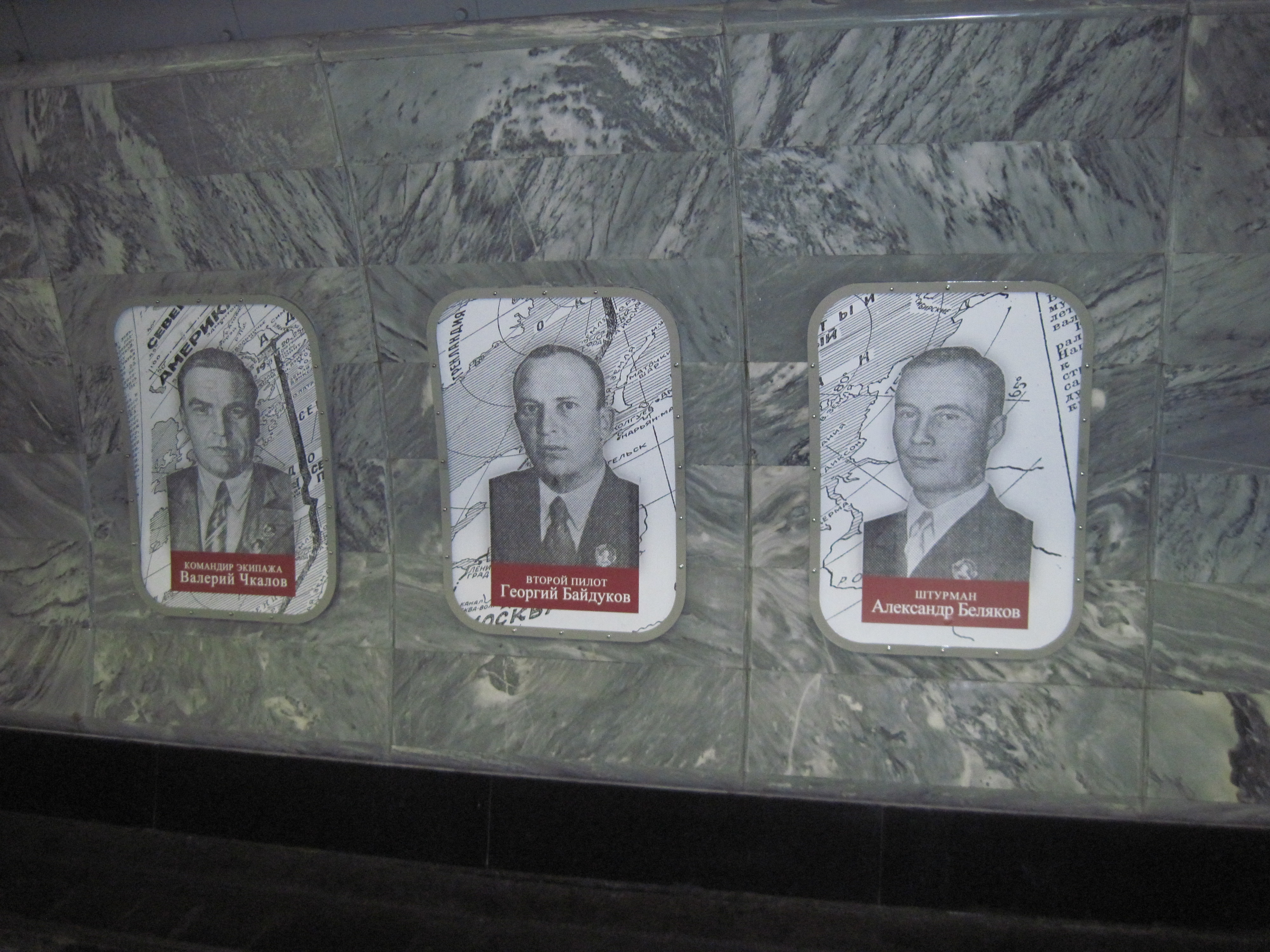
Portraits of 3 pilots in Chkalov's crew

=== Underground passages ===
From the underground lobby, along the escalator, passengers move north to the turnstile hall (at the level of the northern part of house No. 158). From there, through underground passages, which have the shape of a closed "square," you can get to all 4 corners of the 8 Marta – Shchorsa intersection: to the south-west, to two exits in front of house No. 158, one of them is from the 8 Marta street, the other is from Shchorsa street; to the south-east, to two exits in front of the building of the Southern Bus Station, also one from the side of 8 Marta street, the other – from Shchorsa street; to the northwest to a residential building on the 8 Marta street, 150; and also to the north-east to two exits in front of the Central Bank of Russia (Shchorsa st., 86). There are 7 ground entrances in total.

== Ground Public transportation ==
The station has exits to ground public transportation stops: buses, trams, trolleybuses and route taxis.

Tables: public transport routes (data as of April 2015)

Buses
No.	toward Metro Station	End Point 1	End Point 2
23	«Uralskaya» («Zh.D. Vokzal» stop), «Ploshchad 1905 Goda», «Geologicheskaya» («Tsirk» stop), «Chkalovskaya» («Avtovokzal» stop)	Akademgorodok	Zh.D. Vokzal
50	«Ploshchad 1905 Goda», «Geologicheskaya» («Tsirk» stop), «Chkalovskaya» («Avtovokzal» stop)	Ural Federal University	17 Mekhkolonna
54	«Ploshchad 1905 Goda», «Geologicheskaya» («Tsirk» stop), «Chkalovskaya» («Avtovokzal» stop)	Ural Federal University	Krasnolesye
57	«Uralskaya» («Vokzalnaya» stop), «Ploshchad 1905 Goda», «Geologicheskaya» («Tsirk» stop), «Chkalovskaya» («Avtovokzal» stop),	Pekhotintsev street	Elizavet
57А	«Uralskaya» («Vokzalnaya» stop), «Ploshchad 1905 Goda», «Geologicheskaya» («Tsirk» stop), «Chkalovskaya» («Avtovokzal» stop),	Pekhotintsev street	Elizavet

Trams
No.	toward Metro Station	End Point 1	End Point 2
1	«Geologicheskaya» («Tsirk» stop), «Chkalovskaya» («Avtovokzal» stop)	VIZ (Vizovsky residential area)	microdistrict Vtorchermet
5	«Uralmash (Yekaterinburg Metro)», «Mashinostroiteley» («Peduniversitet» stop), «Uralskaya» («Zh.D. Vokzal» stop), «Geologicheskaya» («Tsirk» stop), «Chkalovskaya» («Avtovokzal» stop), «Botanicheskaya»	UZTM (Uralmash factory)	Botanicheskaya
9	«Geologicheskaya» («Tsirk» stop), «Chkalovskaya» («Avtovokzal» stop)	Mayakovsky Central Park of Culture and Leisure	Keramicheskaya
14	«Mashinostroiteley» («Peduniversitet» stop), «Geologicheskaya» («Tsirk» stop), «Chkalovskaya» («Avtovokzal» stop)	Elmash	Keramicheskaya
15	«Ploshchad 1905 Goda», «Geologicheskaya» («Tsirk» stop), «Chkalovskaya» («Avtovokzal» stop)	microdistrict Vtorchermet	40 Let Vlksm street
25	«Prospekt Kosmonavtov (Yekaterinburg Metro)», «Mashinostroiteley» (остановка «Педуниверситет»), «Geologicheskaya» («Tsirk» stop), «Chkalovskaya» («Avtovokzal» stop)	Frezerovshchikov street	Keramicheskaya
27	«Uralskaya» («Zh.D. Vokzal» stop), «Ploshchad 1905 Goda», «Geologicheskaya» («Tsirk» stop), «Chkalovskaya» («Avtovokzal» stop)	Keramicheskaya	Zh.D. Vokzal

Trolleybuses
No.	toward Metro Station	End Point 1	End Point 2
11	«Uralskaya» («Hotel Sverdlovsk» stop), «Chkalovskaya» («Avtovokzal» stop)	Hotel Sverdlovsk	Onufriyeva street
14	«Chkalovskaya» («Avtovokzal» stop)	Dekabristov street	Akademgorodok
