= Yekaterinburg Metro =

Rapid transit system in Russia

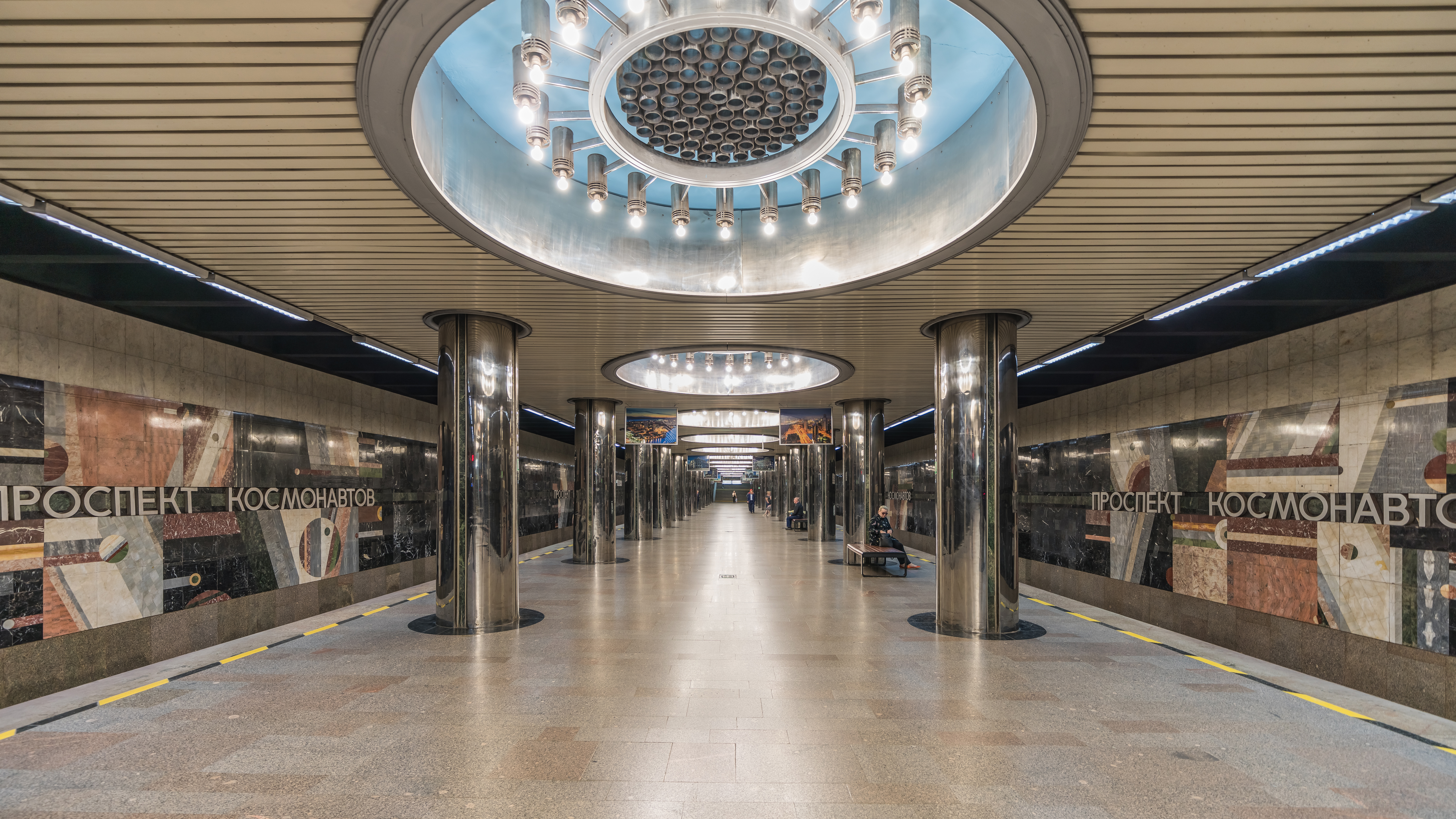
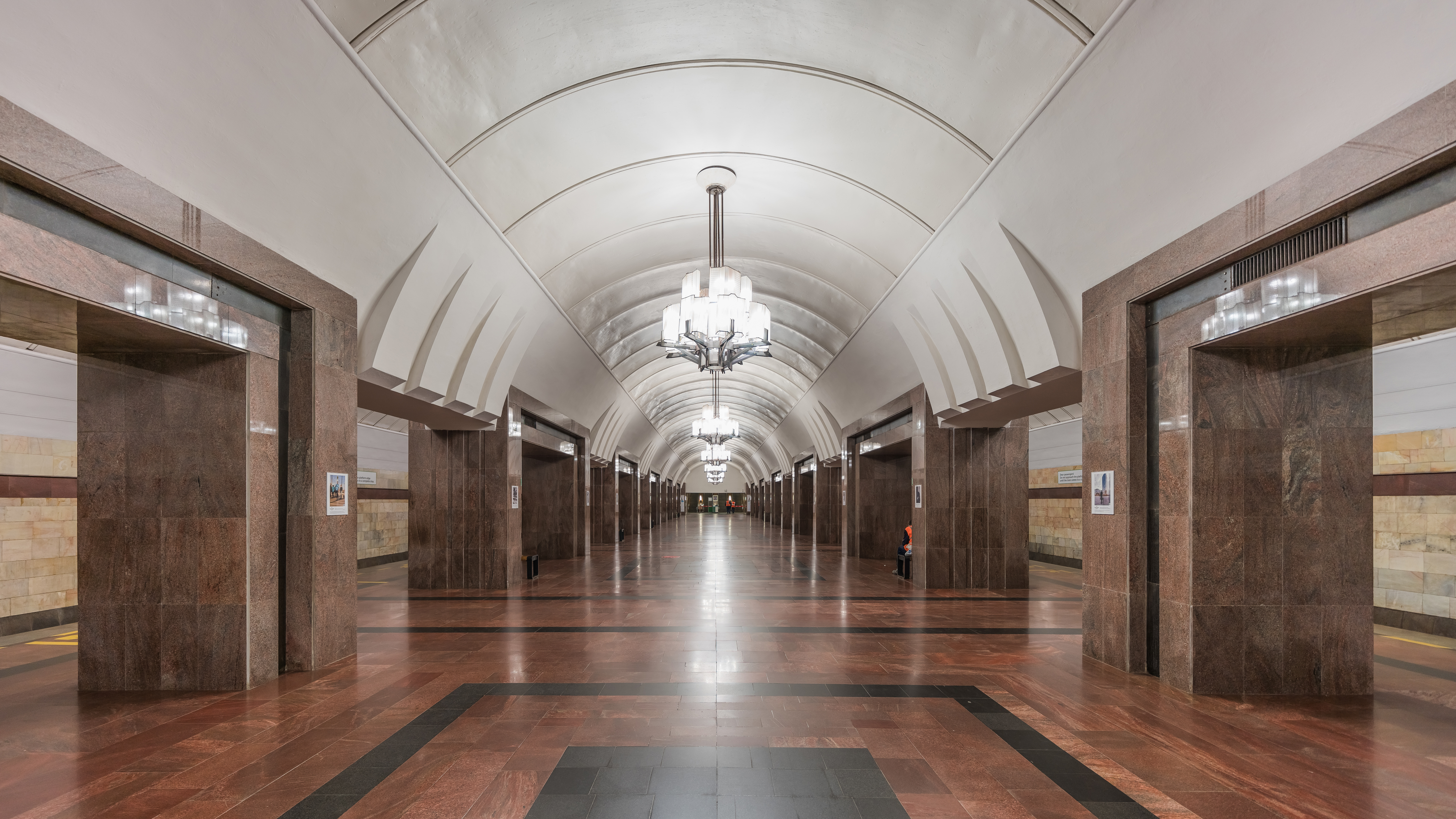
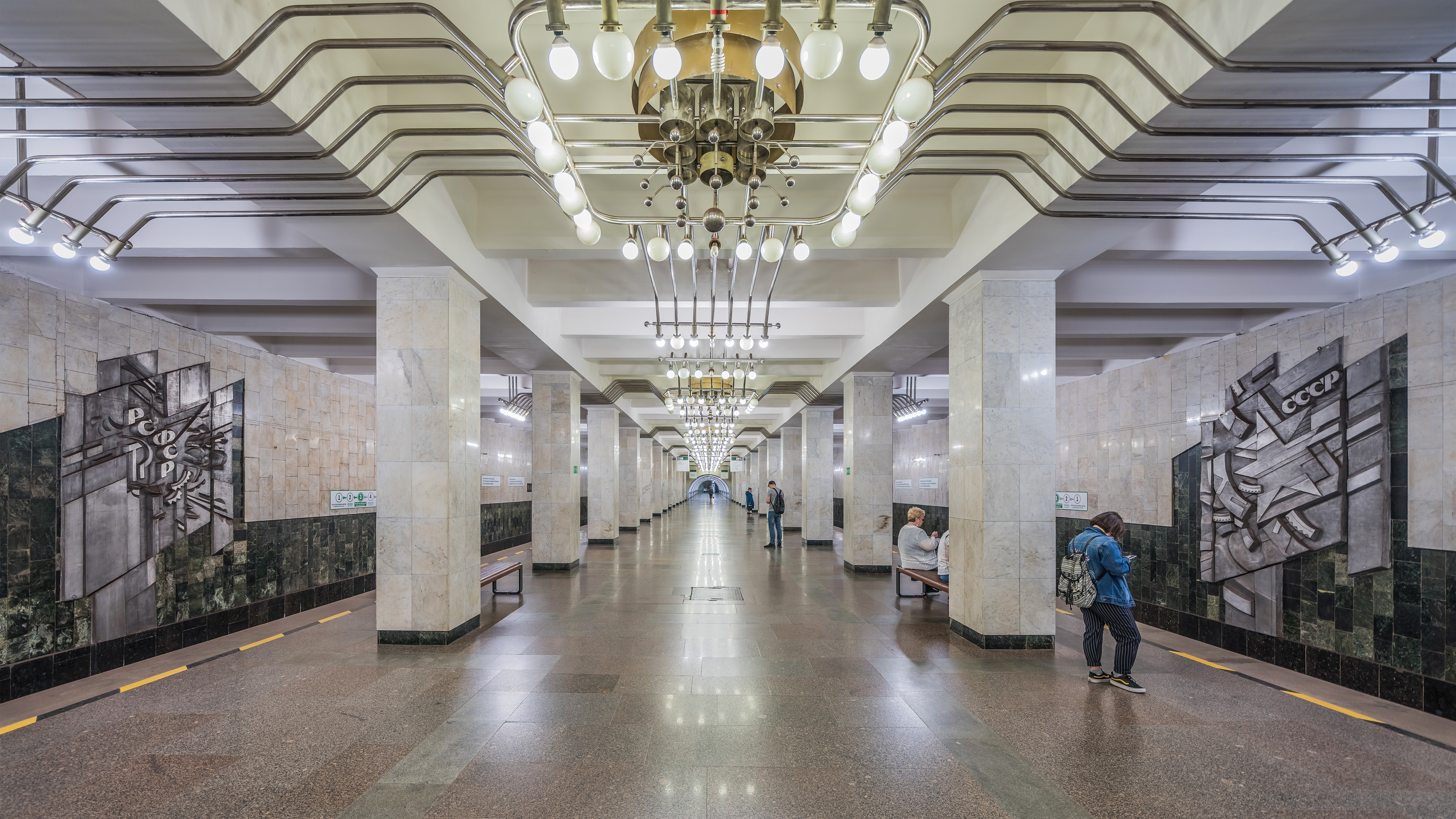
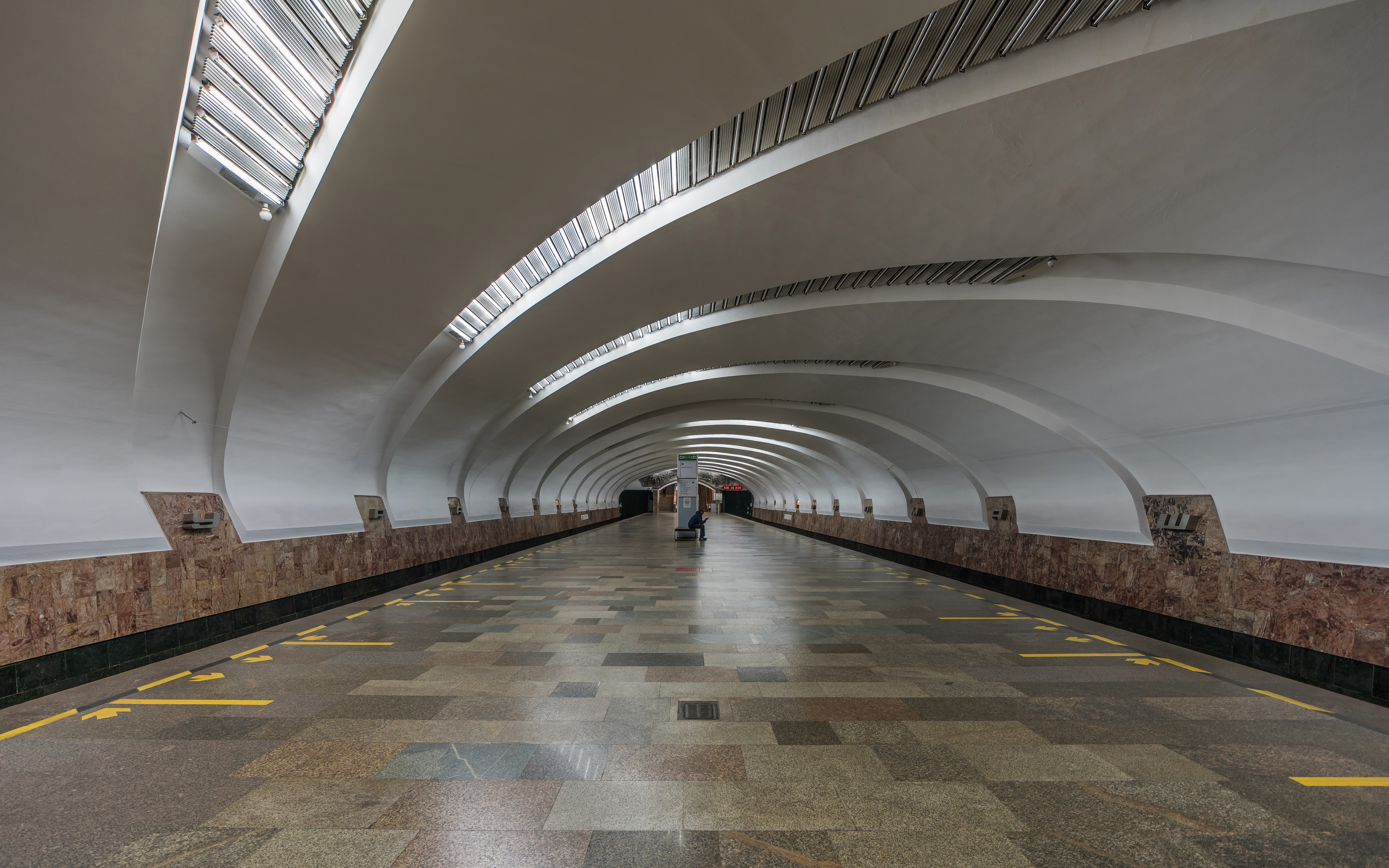
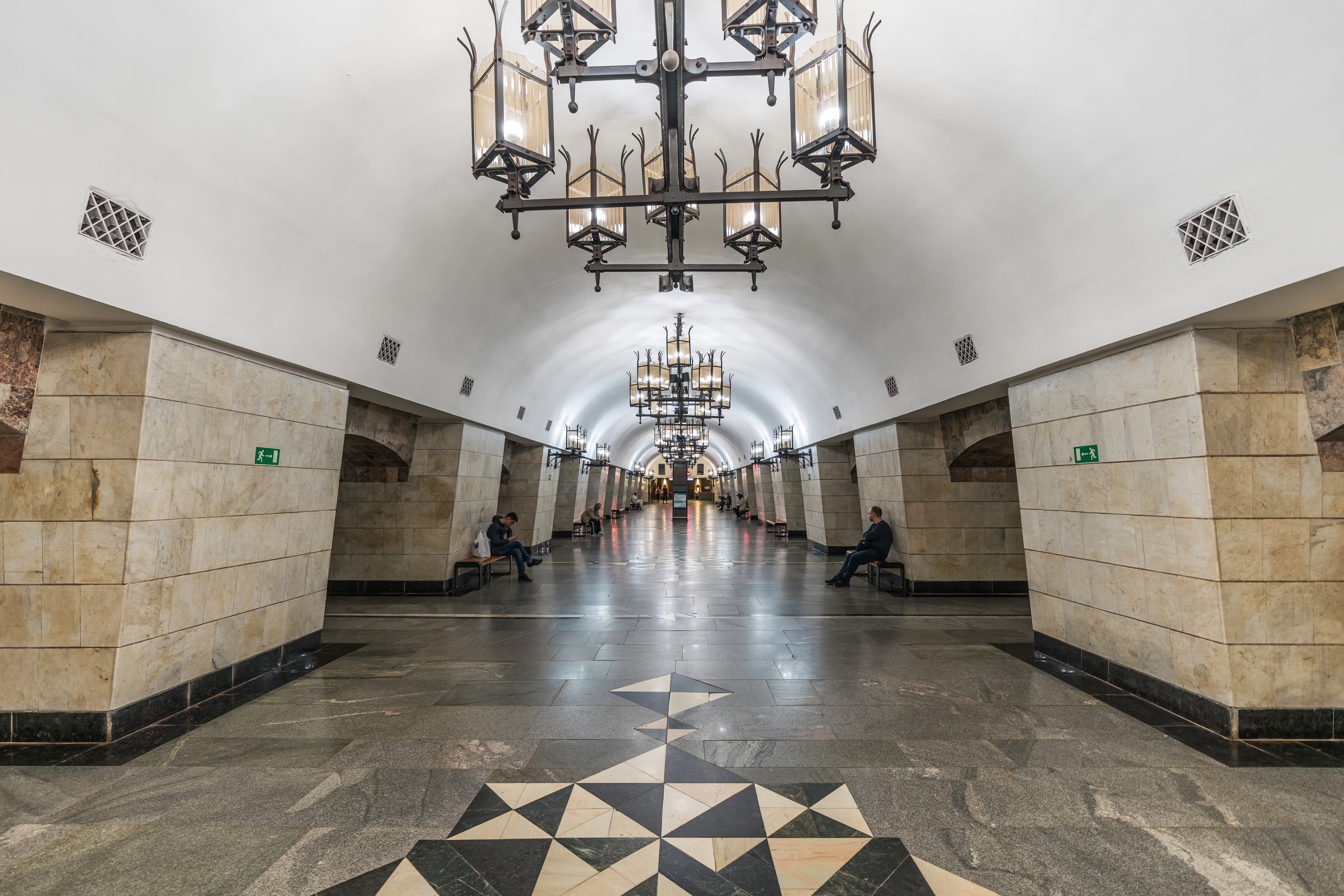
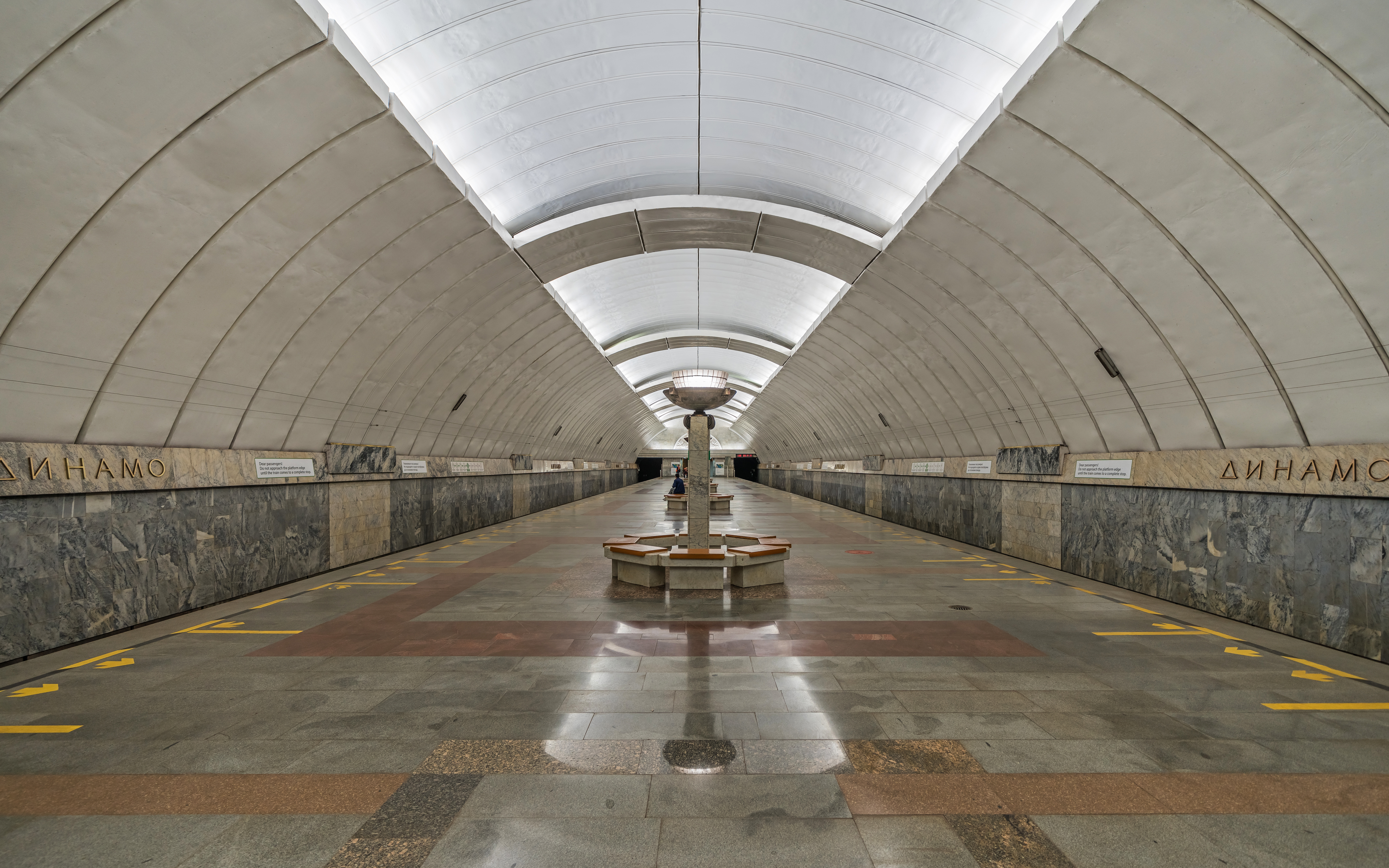
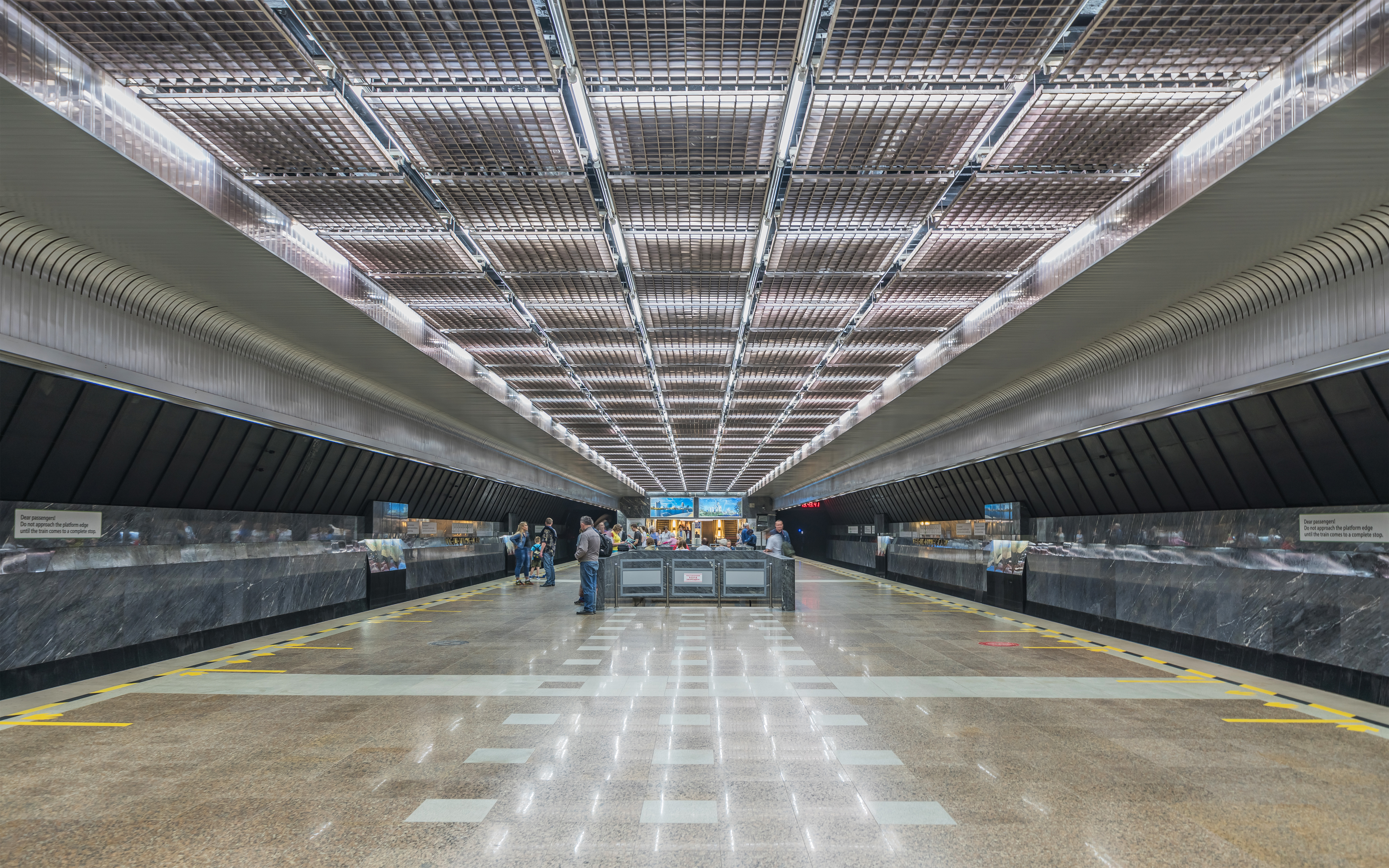
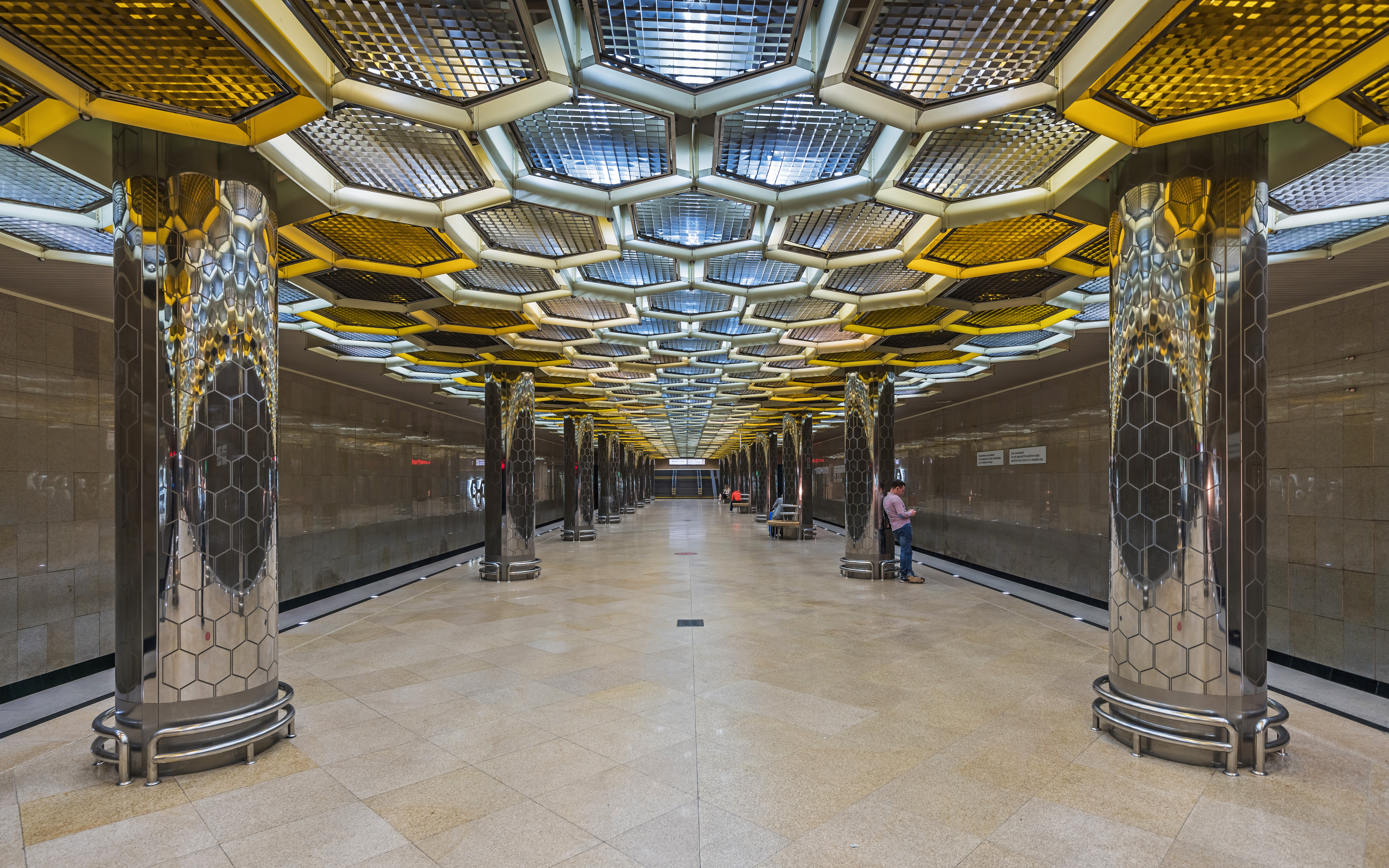
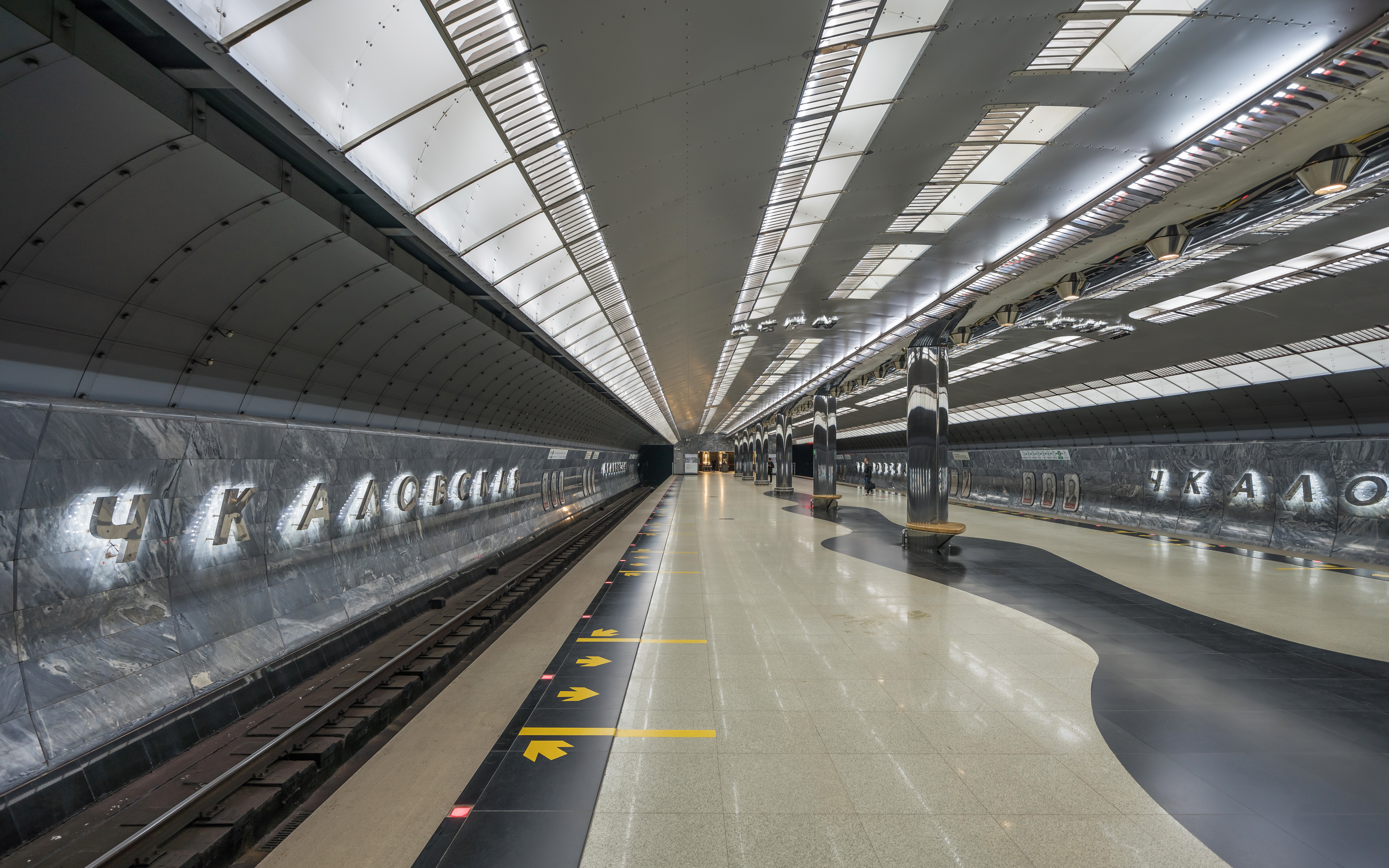

Overview
- Native name: Russian: Екатеринбург- ский метрополитен (Ekaterinburgskiy metropoliten)
- Locale: Yekaterinburg, Russia
- Transit type: Rapid transit
- Number of lines: 1
- Number of stations: 9
- Daily ridership: 130,000 (daily average, 2012)
- Website: metro-ektb.ru

Operation
- Began operation: 26 April 1991; 35 years ago

Technical
- System length: 12.7 km (7.9 mi)
- Track gauge: 1,524 mm (5 ft)
System map

The Yekaterinburg Metro (Russian: Екатеринбургский метрополитен, romanized: Jekaterinburgskij metropoliten) is a rapid transit system that serves the city of Yekaterinburg, Russia. The Metro opened on 26 April 1991, and is 12.7 kilometres (7.9 mi) long and serves 9 stations. The Yekaterinburg Metro was the 13th and last metro to open in the USSR.

== History ==
Yekaterinburg, formerly called Sverdlovsk, was always known as the informal capital of the Urals, a natural divide between Europe and Asia, between European Russia and Siberia. The city grew very rapidly because it was an important industrial centre and a transport hub. Plans for a rapid-transit system began in the late 1970s, and in 1980 construction began.

The city's uneven landscape, as well as its layout with a very dense city centre, prompted to combine deep and shallow stations. On 26 April 1991, the sixth Metro of Russia and the thirteenth and last Metro of the Soviet Union, which ceased to exist only a few months later, was finally opened to the public. The economic crisis of the early 1990s rocked the Metro very hard and the first stage comprised only three stations. However, then-president Boris Yeltsin diverted state funds to complete its construction and by 1995 the Metro was doubled in length. Since then, only two extensions have been built.

=== Timeline ===
Segment	Date opened
Prospekt Kosmonavtov–Mashinostroiteley	26 April 1991
Mashinostroiteley–Uralskaya	22 December 1992
Uralskaya–Ploshchad 1905 Goda	22 December 1994
Ploshchad 1905 Goda–Geologicheskaya	30 December 2002
Geologicheskaya–Botanicheskaya	28 November 2011
Chkalovskaya	28 July 2012

== Stations ==
The system serves nine stations along a single line roughly stretching from the north to the south. It has the least stations out of Russia's seven metro systems, but boasts the fourth-highest ridership as of 2019, behind Moscow's, St. Petersburg's and Novosibirsk's. In addition to that, the Bazhovskaya station between the Geologicheskaya and the Chkalovskaya stations was built but never opened. FInally, plans have been proposed to construct two additional stations: Kalinovskaya to the north and Uktusskie Gory to the south of the existing line.

Station	Transfers (Note: All stations are connected to surface transit: for convenience reasons, buses and trolleybuses are not shown.)	Opened
Kalinovskaya	—N/a	planned
Prospekt Kosmonavtov	trams №14, 333	1991
Uralmash	trams №5, 8, 24	1991
Mashinostroiteley	trams №2, 5, 7, 8, 14, 24	1991
Uralskaya	trams №3, 7, 12, 21, 23; Yekaterinburg–Passazhirsky; Northern Bus Terminal	1992
Dinamo	—N/a	1994
Ploshchad 1905 Goda	—N/a	1994
Geologicheskaya	trams №1, 3, 4, 10, 12, 14, 15, 17	2002
~~Bashovskaya~~	—N/a	never opened
Chkalovskaya	trams №1, 4, 14, 15, 17; Southern Bus Terminal	2012
Botanicheskaya	trams №4, 9	2011
Uktusskie Gory	—N/a	planned

== Operation ==
The Metro is a typical Soviet design, which when completed will form a triangle from three lines intersecting in the city centre. The eight stations comprise 12.7 kilometres (7.9 mi) of length and are split between deep and shallow. Of the latter, four are pillar-trispans and one is a single vault (built to Kharkov technology). The deep-level stations include one pylon, one column and two Leningrad-technology single vaults, although one was built to a design making it appear as a single deck. Like all ex-Soviet Metros, the stations are elaborately decorated, although economic hardships prevented the full original designs from being implemented.

The Metro is served by one depot, Kalinovskoye, and 62 cars are assigned to it, even though the depot is counted for 70 cars. Most trains are of types 81-717.5/714.5, built by MMZ (Metrovagonmash) and LVZ (Factory of Egorov in Saint Petersburg) during the late 1980s and early 1990s. The metro is also serving 81-717.5M/714.5M which is a variant of 81-717.5/714.5. Since 2019, the metro is serving two new four carriage train sets of type 81-717.6/714.6 which are a lot more comfortable and advanced. Currently, the oldest carriages are being refurbished in order to extend their service limit to more 15 years.

Ridership has improved in recent years. In 2011, the average daily ridership on the Metro was 105,000. By 2012, the average daily ridership had increased to 130,000. This corresponds to an annual ridership in 2012 of approximately 47.45 million people.

In December 2024 a commemorative plaque was installed to mark the 45th anniversary of the start of construction of the Metro. The names of 62 builders, designers and specialists who contributed to the development of the subway are immortalized on this board.

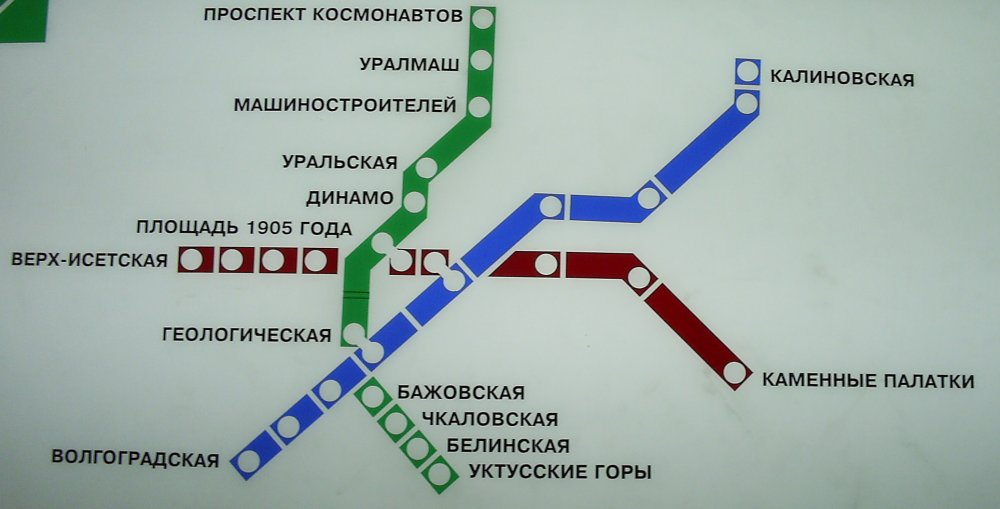
Plan of the Yekaterinburg Metro

== Plans ==
The construction of the Bazhovskaya station which should be between the "Geologicheskaya" and "Chkalovskaya" has been postponed indefinitely.

The first section of the second line with length of 4.5 km should have four stations: "Metallurgicheskaya", "Tatishchyevskaya", "Ploshchad Kommunarov" and "Ploshchad 1905 Goda". Station "Tatishchyevskaya" and "Ploshchad Kommunarov" will be near Central Stadium, which hosted the FIFA World Cup 2018 matches. The opening was originally planned for 2018. However, only pre-development was finished in 2013 and the design competition had not been declared, the construction was delayed, and the 2018 opening was not feasible.

== Gallery ==
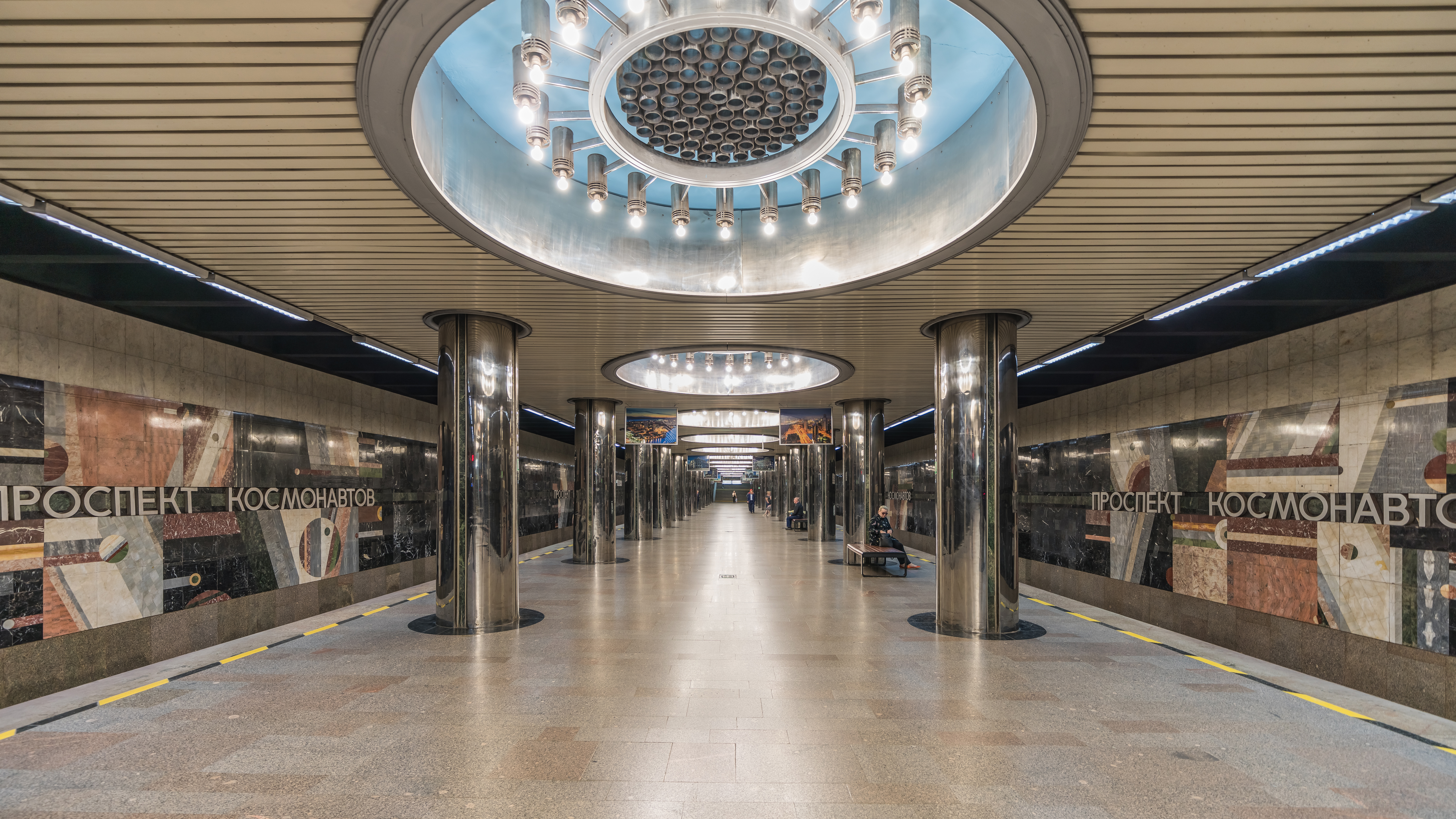
Prospekt Kosmonavtov station

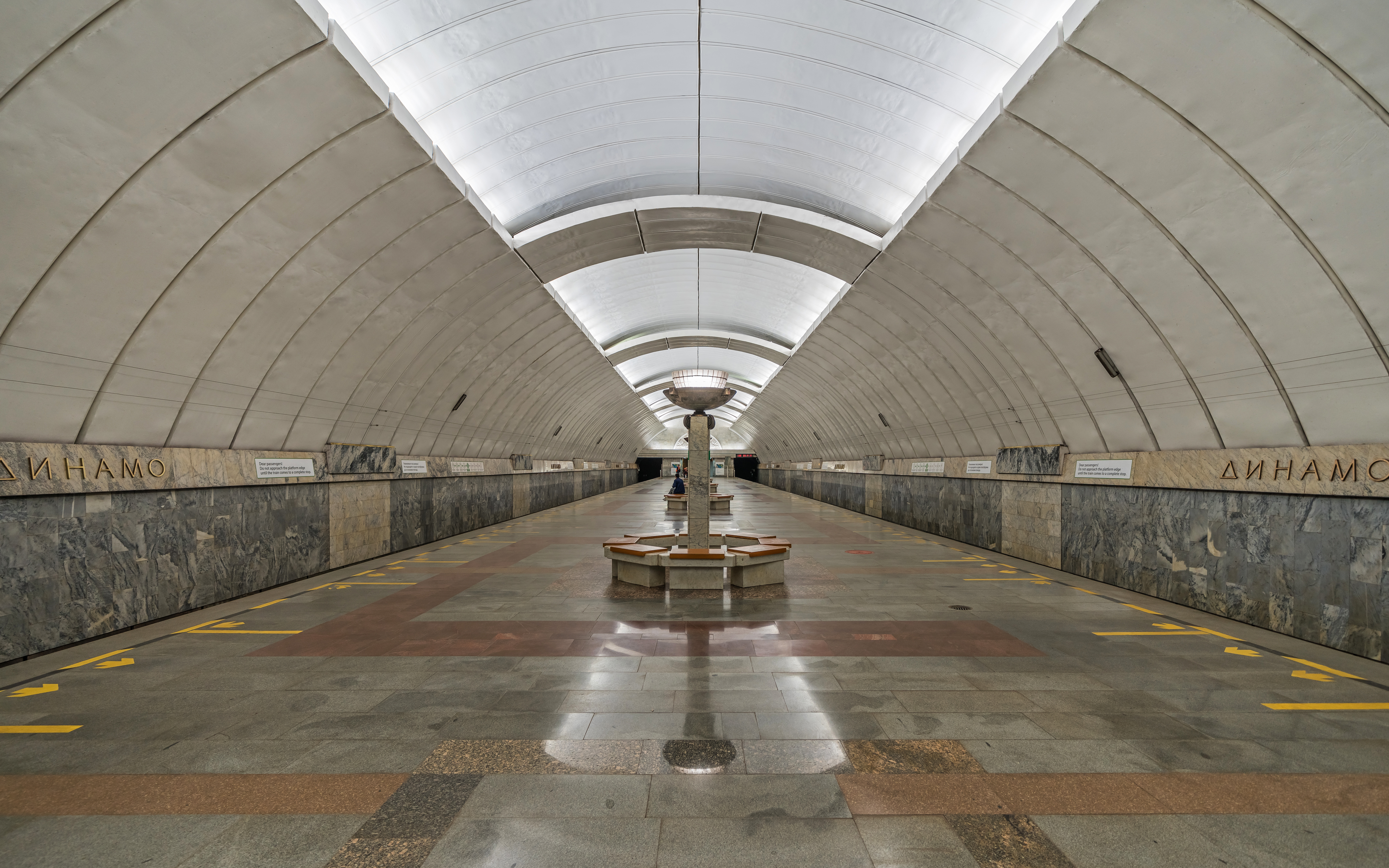
Dinamo station

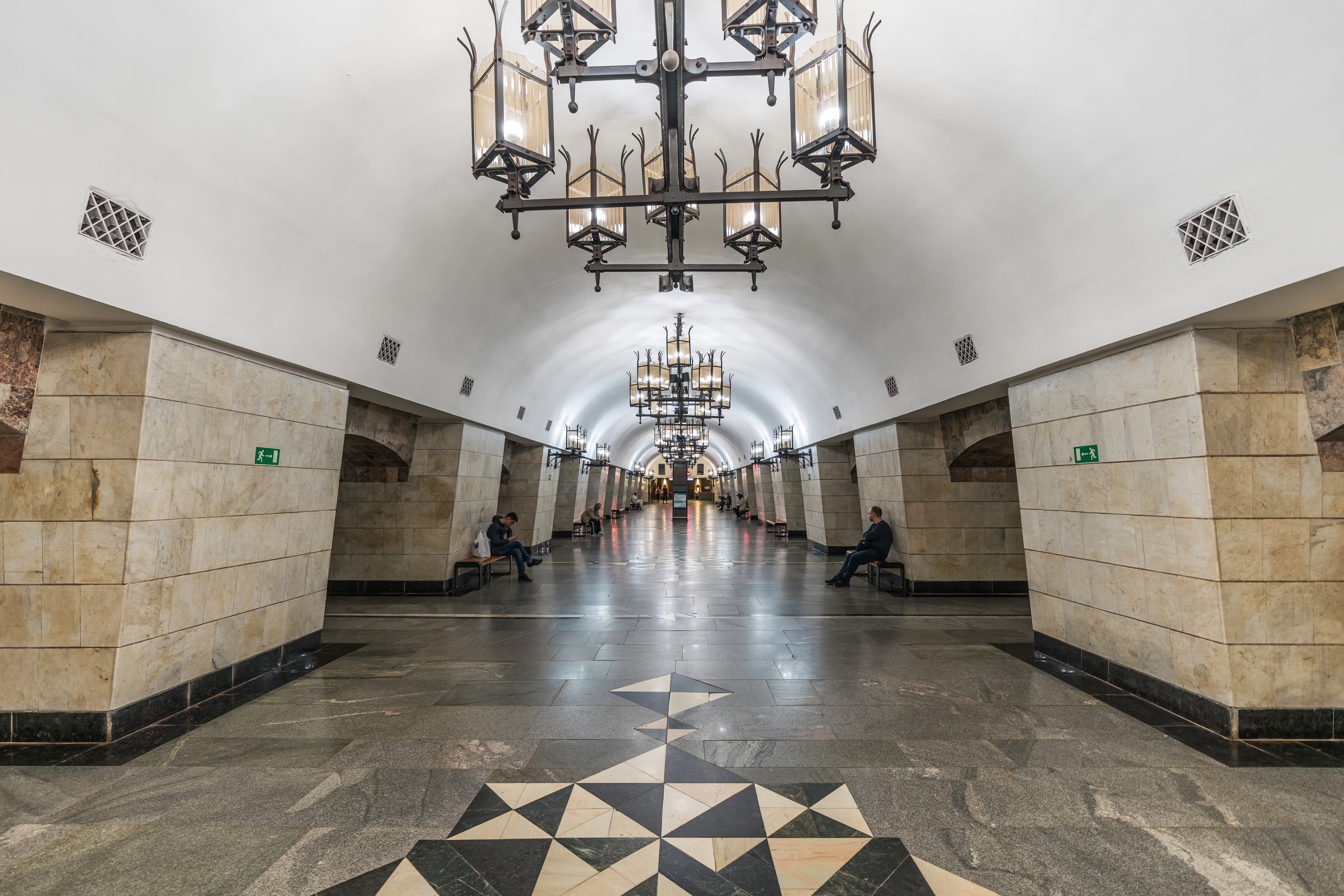
Uralskaya station

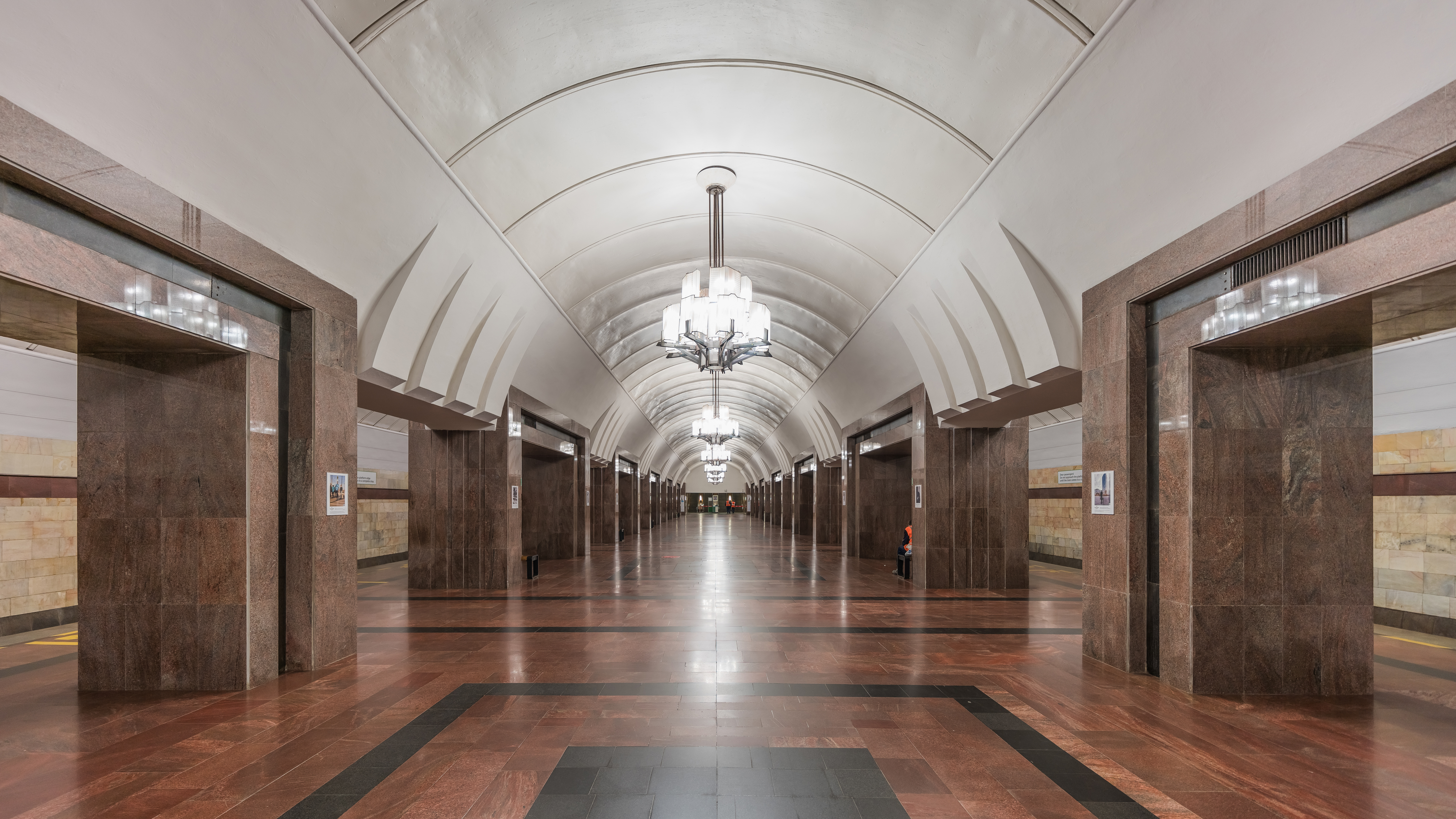
Ploschad 1905 goda station

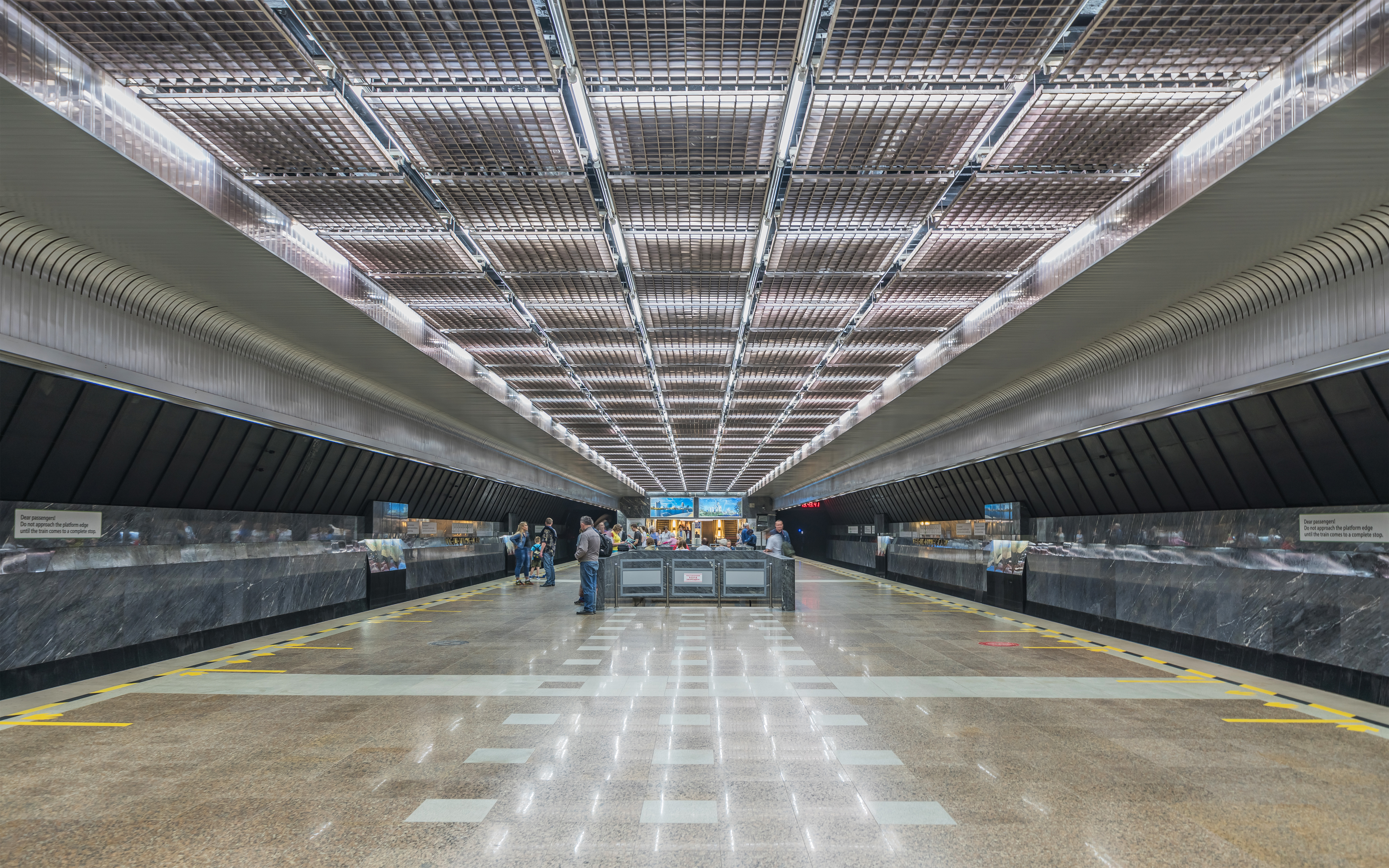
Geologicheskaya station

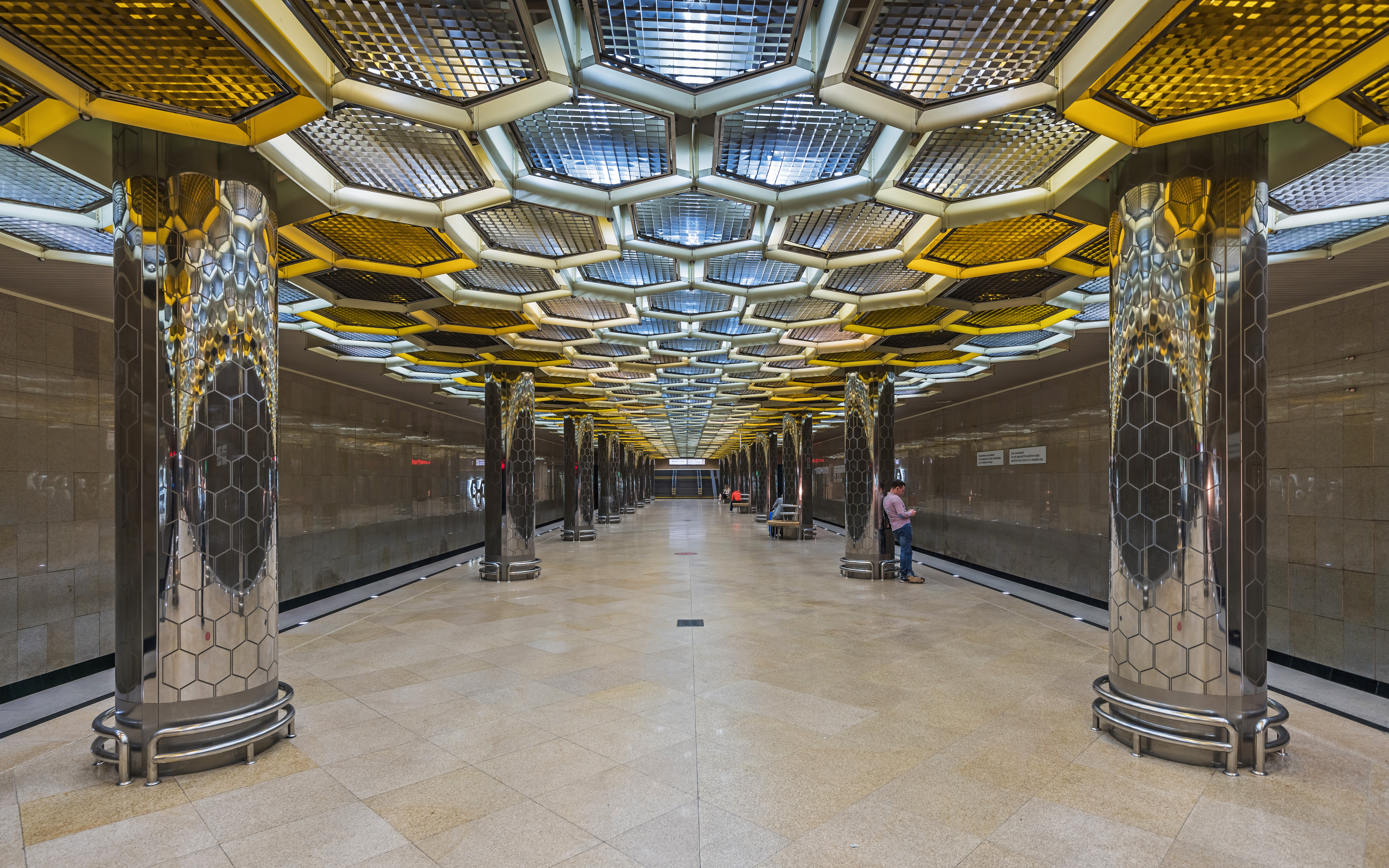
Botanicheskaya metro station

== See also ==
- List of metro systems
