= Uralskaya (Yekaterinburg Metro) =

Rapid transit station in Russia

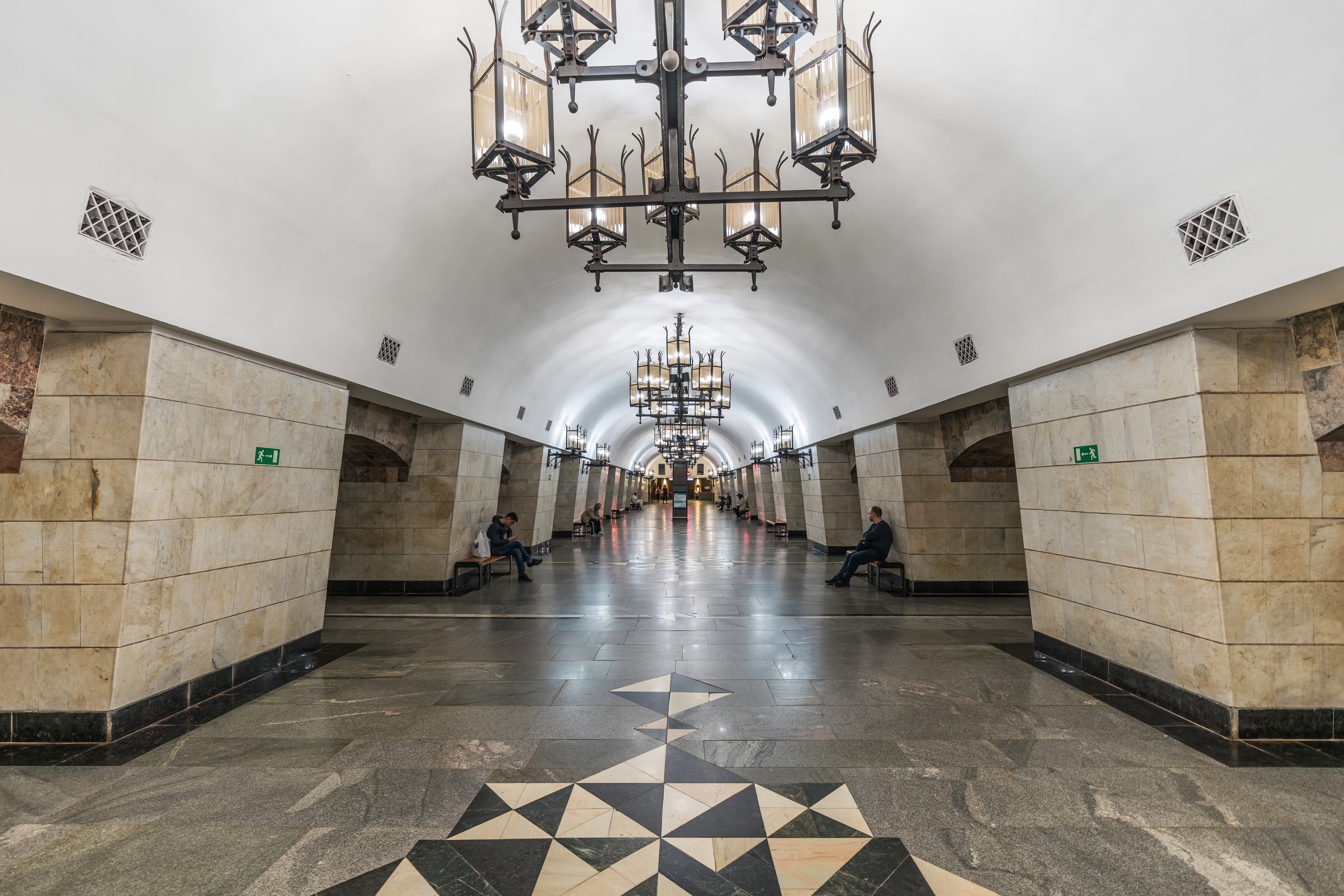

General information
- Coordinates: 56.858056°N 60.601389°E
- System: Yekaterinburg Metro
- Line: First line
- Platforms: 1
- Tracks: 2

Construction
- Structure type: Island

History
- Opened: 1992-12-23

Services
Preceding station	Yekaterinburg Metro	Following station
Mashinostroiteley towards Prospekt Kosmonavtov	First Line	Dinamo towards Botanicheskaya
Route map
Location

Uralskaya (Russian: Уральская) is the 4th station of the Yekaterinburg Metro located on the 1st line between metro stations "Mashinostroiteley" and "Dinamo."

The station was opened on December 23, 1992, as part of the second launch section of the Yekaterinburg metro "Mashinostroiteley" – "Uralskaya".

The station is located next to the railway station and the "Severny" (Northern) bus station.

It is the deepest metro station in Yekaterinburg.

== Construction history ==
- August 28, 1980 – the first excavator bucket of earth was removed from the vertical shaft of the station's shaft at a solemn meeting – construction of the Sverdlovsk (former name of Yekaterinburg) metro had begun.
- September 1980 — tunneling operations deployed.
- December 1980 — a pile driver was assembled to accommodate a tunneling complex.
- May 1981 — shaft sinking completed.
- December 1981 — the first administrative building was built and put into operation near the station.
- July 1982 — the construction of the approach tunnel, the pumping chamber and the tunnel yard was completed, the driving of the running tunnel towards the "Mashinostroiteley" station began.
- August 1982 – construction of tunnels began on the longest stretch of the launch site between "Mashinostroiteley" and "Uralskaya" stations.
- August 1982 – a railway dead end was put into operation with railroad warehouses.
- March 1986 – at the construction of the station tunnels, the installation of a cast iron "shell" of large diameter tubing (8.5 meters) began.
- August 1986 – N. Vopilov's brigade from the "Uralskaya" station, having pierced 750 meters of the right running tunnel underground, made a connection at the intermediate shaft No. 10 (on the stretch to the "Mashinostroiteley" station).
- February 1987 – construction of the inclined escalator passage began.
- December 1987 – work began on the boring of the middle station tunnel.
- November 1988 – A. Pelinsky's team in the left running tunnel on the route between the stations "Uralskaya" and "Mashinostroiteley" were 1560 meters behind.
- February 1989 – after a connection carried out by Y. Gnidin's team in the left running tunnel between the stations "Dinamo" and "Uralskaya", a through passage of the train was provided under the ground along the entire route from the city center to the station "Prospect Kosmonavtov".
- June 1989 – sinking of the inclined course at the "Uralskaya" station completed.
- December 22, 1992 – the state commission was accepted into operation.
- December 23, 1992 – open for passengers.
- December 22, 1994 – open for passengers to the "1905 Square" station.

== Lobbies and transfers ==
The station has one underground lobby connected to the northern end of the platform by four escalators. It was planned to build an underground passage from the lobby to the Yekaterinburg railway station building. A second exit from the station is also planned, leading to Chelyuskintsev street. Currently, there is no data on its construction.

== Technical characteristics ==
- Station construction – pylon deep foundation.
- Foundation depth – 42 meters

== Design ==
On the platform, the pylons stand on cast iron slabs. Inside the pylons (completely unique) natural rock was left. The floor of the platform is made of gray polished granite, the track walls of the station are lined with marble from the Nizhne-Tagil deposit, the pylons are made of marble from the Koelginsky deposit, the arches and other elements of the platform are decorated with slabs of serpentine, the arched frames and niches are made of metal. The chandeliers which are made of forged metal by Viktor Koscheev and manufactured at the Ural Electromechanical Plant – are suspended from the vault.

== Ground public transportation ==
The station has exits to numerous stops (including the final ones) of all types of ground transport: Yekaterinburg buses, Yekaterinburg trolleybuses, Yekaterinburg trams and Yekaterinburg taxi routes.

Table: public transport routes (data as of May 2020)

Buses
No.	toward metro station	End Point 1	End Point 2
1	«Uralskaya» («Zh.D. Vokzal» stop)	Zh.D. Vokzal (Railway Station)	posolok Koltsovo (settlement)
01	«Uralskaya» («Zh.D. Vokzal» stop)	Zh.D. Vokzal	Koltsovo airport
15	«Uralskaya» («Vokzalnaya» stop)	Pekhotintsev	40 let VLKSM Street
21	«Uralskaya» («Zh.D. Vokzal» stop), «Ploshchad 1905 Goda»	Krasnolesye	Zh.D. Vokzal
23	«Uralskaya» («Zh.D. Vokzal» stop), «Ploshchad 1905 Goda», «Geologicheskaya» («Tsirk» (circus) stop), «Chkalovskaya» («Vokzalnaya» stop)	Akademgorodok	Zh.D. Vokzal
31	«Uralskaya» («Zh.D. Vokzal» stop)	Zh.D. Vokzal	Traktovaya
043	«Uralskaya» («Zh.D. Vokzal» stop)	Zh.D. Vokzal	Severka
045	«Uralskaya» («Zh.D. Vokzal» stop), «Ploshchad 1905 Goda»	Zh.D. Vokzal	NPTs Onkologiya
48	«Uralskaya» («Zh.D. Vokzal» stop), «Ploshchad 1905 Goda»	Shirokaya Rechka	Gorbol'nitsa No. 7 (city hospital)
052	«Uralskaya» («Zh.D. Vokzal» stop), «Ploshchad 1905 Goda»	Zh.K. Poles'ye (residential complex)	Gorbol'nitsa No. 7
056	«Uralskaya» («Zh.D. Vokzal» stop), «Ploshchad 1905 Goda», «Geologicheskaya» («Tsirk» stop), «Chkalovskaya» («Avtovokzal» stop)	Sosnovy Bor	Uralobuv'
57	«Uralskaya» («Zh.D. Vokzal» stop), «Ploshchad 1905 Goda», «Geologicheskaya» («Tsirk» stop), «Chkalovskaya» («Avtovokzal» stop)	Pekhotintsev	Elizavet
57А	«Uralskaya» («Zh.D. Vokzal» stop), «Ploshchad 1905 Goda», «Geologicheskaya» («Tsirk» stop), «Chkalovskaya» («Avtovokzal» stop)	DMB No. 9	2nd Novosibirskaya street
60	«Uralskaya» («Vokzal'naya» stop)	TRTs Karnaval	Siniye Kamni Microdistrict
082	«Uralskaya» («Vokzal'naya» stop)	Uraltekhgaz	TK KOR
120	«Uralskaya» («Vokzal'naya» stop)	Yekaterinburg	Kosulino
147	«Uralskaya» («Zh.D. Vokzal» stop)	Zh.D. Vokzal	Tavatuy

Trams
No.	toward next station	End Point 1	End Point 2
3	«Uralskaya» («Zh.D. Vokzal» stop), «Geologicheskaya» («Tsirk» stop)	Mayakovsky Central Park of Culture and Leisure	Mayakovsky Central Park of Culture and Leisure
5	«Uralmash», «Mashinostroiteley» («Peduniversitet» stop), «Uralskaya» («Zh.D. Vokzal» stop)	UZTM (Uralmash factory)	40 let VLKSM Street
7	«Mashinostroiteley» («Peduniversitet» stop), «Uralskaya» («Zh.D. Vokzal» stop)	Elmash	7 Klyuchey Microdistrict
21	«Uralskaya» («Zh.D. Vokzal» stop), Geologicheskaya («Tsirk» stop)	Mayakovsky Central Park of Culture and Leisure	Kirova street
23	«Uralskaya» («Zh.D. Vokzal» stop)	Mashinostroiteley street	40 let VLKSM Street
27	«Uralskaya» («Zh.D. Vokzal» stop), «Ploshchad 1905 Goda», «Geologicheskaya» («Tsirk» stop), «Chkalovskaya» («Avtovokzal» stop)	Keramicheskaya (circle)	Zh.D. Vokzal
32	«Uralskaya» («Zh.D. Vokzal» stop), «Geologicheskaya» («Tsirk» stop)	Dvorets Sporta (Palace of Sports)	40 let VLKSM Street

Trolleybuses
No.	toward metro station	End Point 1	End Point 2
1	«Uralskaya» («Zh.D. Vokzal» stop), «Botanicheskaya» («Shvartsa street» stop)	Zh.D. Vokzal	Khimmash
3	«Prospekt Kosmonavtov», «Uralmash», «Mashinostroiteley» («Peduniversitet» stop), «Uralskaya» («Zh.D. Vokzal» stop), «Ploshchad 1905 Goda» ("Ploshchad Malysheva" and "Rubin" stops),	Kommunisticheskaya street	Tokarey street
5	«Prospekt Kosmonavtov», «Uralmash», «Mashinostroiteley» («Peduniversitet» stop), «Uralskaya» («Zh.D. Vokzal» stop)	Kommunisticheskaya street	Mayakovsky Central Park of Culture and Leisure
9	«Uralskaya» («Zh.D. Vokzal» stop), «Botanicheskaya» («Shvartsa street» stop)	Zh.D. Vokzal	Tobacco factory «Al'vis»
11	«Uralskaya» («Hotel Sverdlovsk» stop), «Chkalovskaya» («Avtovokzal» stop)	Hotel Sverdlovsk	Onufriyeva street
15	«Uralskaya» («Hotel Sverdlovsk» stop), «Botanicheskaya» («Krestinsky street» and «Shvartsa street» stops)	Hotel Sverdlovsk	Botanicheskaya Microdistrict
17	«Uralmash», «Mashinostroiteley» («Peduniversitet» stop), «Uralskaya» («Zh.D. Vokzal» stop), «Ploshchad 1905 Goda» ("Ploshchad Malysheva" and "Rubin" stops)	UZTM (Uralmash factory)	UZTM (Uralmash factory) (circle)
18	«Uralskaya» («Hotel Sverdlovsk» stop)	Akademicheskaya (circle, outer ring)	–
19	«Uralskaya» («Hotel Sverdlovsk» stop)	Akademicheskaya (circle, inner ring)	–

== Interesting facts ==
- The section "Mashinostroiteley" – "Uralskaya" is the longest in the Yekaterinburg Metro.
- "Uralskaya" station is the deepest in the Yekaterinburg Metro.
- In recent years, the lighting at the "Uralskaya" station has been replaced: initially, the light fixtures of this station had incandescent light bulbs, and now – special fluorescent light bulbs of an intricate shape.

== Ссылки ==
- «Uralskaya» station on the site «Metro World»
- «Uralskaya» station on the new site «Metro World»
