= Ploshchad 1905 Goda =

Yekaterinburg Metro station

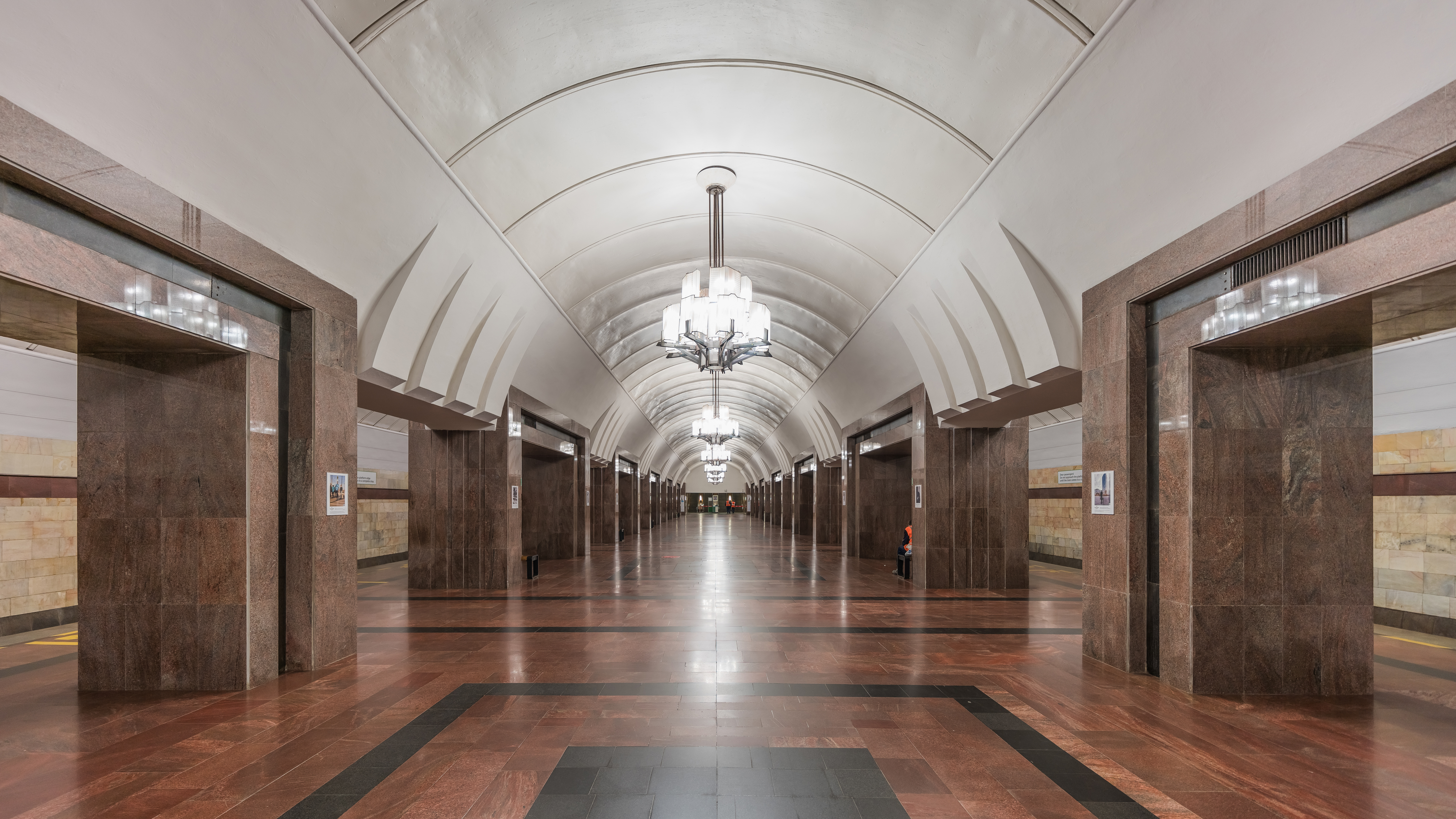

General information
- Coordinates: 56.835833°N 60.599722°E
- System: Yekaterinburg Metro
- Line: First line
- Platforms: 1
- Tracks: 2

Construction
- Structure type: island

History
- Opened: 1994-12-22

Services
Preceding station	Yekaterinburg Metro	Following station
Dinamo towards Prospekt Kosmonavtov	First Line	Geologicheskaya towards Botanicheskaya
Route map
Location

Ploshchad 1905 Goda (Russian: Площадь 1905 года) is the sixth station of the Yekaterinburg Metro. It was opened on December 22, 1994. It is located between stations «Dinamo» and «Geologicheskaya» and is next to the central square of the city – 1905 Square (Yekaterinburg). There are exits to the streets: 8 Marta and Teatralny lane.

== Construction History ==
February 1981 — tunneling work continued at the station, construction of surface sites began.
June 1981 — the demolition of old houses began in the area of the station (streets Uritskovo and Volodarskovo).
October 1981 — launch of access branches.
February 1982 — tunnel shaft reinforcement completed.
June 1983 — tunneling of both tunnels began on the stretch from the station "Dinamo" to the station "Ploshchad 1905 Goda".
June 1986 — a pedestrian crossing in the area of 8th Marta Street and Teatralny Lane was made in connection with the construction of the southern lobby of the station; the transfer of tram tracks to Moskovskaya Street began.
November 1986 — construction of station tunnels began after the opening of tram traffic on Moskovskaya street on November 15.
May 1987 — the development of the pit under station lobby No. 1 began.
December 1987 — after passing several hundred meters under the city pond, the builders made a connection in the left running tunnel to "Dinamo" station.
March 1988 — the first tubing is installed in an inclined escalator tunnel.
April 1988 — N. Chulpanov's complex brigade made a connection in the right underground corridor connecting the stations "Ploshchad 1905 Goda" and "Dinamo", 736 meters are completed including under the city pond.
June 1989 — the installation of the power traction substation (PTS) is complete.
December 22, 1994 — the head of the city of Yekaterinburg approves the "act of the state commission on acceptance into operation". The metro is open for passenger traffic toward the station "Prospect Kosmonavtov".
January 1996 — a crossover is made in tunneling towards the station "Geologicheskaya".
December 30, 2002 — open for traffic to the station "Geologicheskaya".

== Design ==
The deep column, three-aisled station was designed by architects of the Sverdlovsk Institute – it was a civil project by Kusenko, Zaslavsky and L. Maslennikov, dedicated to the revolutionary events of 1905. The supports of the vaults are made in the form of granite portals separating the middle hall from the side landing sections of the platform. The color scheme of the interior is contrasting red Karelian granite lined portals and white marble track walls. The lighting fixtures of the central hall are chandeliers and sconces. Recently (as of February 2011), incandescent light bulbs have been replaced with energy-saving lightbulbs in lighting fixtures, as in the Uralskaya station. On the track walls, there are artistic thematic inserts made in the Florentine mosaic technique by Ural stone carving craftsman.

== Future ==
In the future, the station "Ploshchad 1905 Goda" (of the first Yekaterinburg metro line) will become a transfer hub to the station "Ploshchad 1905 Goda" of the 2nd planned metro line. In the northern part of the station, it is planned to open a second exit, which will simultaneously become an exit to the city (at the intersection of 8th Marta Street and Lenin Avenue) and a transfer to Line 2.

== Ground Public transportation ==
The station has exits to multiple stops (including the final ones) of all types of ground transportation: buses, trolleybuses, trams and taxi routes.

Tables: public transport routes (data as of May 2020)

Buses
No.	toward metro station	End Point 1	End Point 2
011	«Ploshchad 1905 Goda», «Geologicheskaya» («Tsirk» stop), «Chkalovskaya» («Avtovokzal» stop)	Pekhotintsev	T.Ts. Lerua Merlen (Leroy Merlin shopping center (hardware store))
012	«Ploshchad 1905 Goda», «Geologicheskaya» («Tsirk» stop), «Chkalovskaya» («Avtovokzal» stop), «Botanicheskaya»	Elizavet	Pavla Shamanova street
014	«Ploshchad 1905 Goda», «Geologicheskaya» («Tsirk» stop), «Chkalovskaya» («Avtovokzal» stop)	T.Ts. Lenta (shopping center)	DMB No. 9
016	«Ploshchad 1905 Goda», «Geologicheskaya» («Tsirk» stop), «Chkalovskaya» («Avtovokzal» stop), «Botanicheskaya»	DMB No. 9	Yuzhnaya podstantsiya (South substation)
018	«Ploshchad 1905 Goda», «Geologicheskaya» («Tsirk» stop), «Chkalovskaya» («Avtovokzal» stop)	17th Mekhkalonka	Avangard
019	«Ploshchad 1905 Goda», «Geologicheskaya» («Tsirk» stop), «Chkalovskaya» («Avtovokzal» stop), «Botanicheskaya»	Elizavet	Pavla Shamanova street
19	«Ploshchad 1905 Goda»	Ploshchad 1905 Goda	Khimmash
21	«Uralskaya» («Zh.D. Vokzal» stop), «Ploshchad 1905 Goda»	Krasnolesye	Zh.D. Vokzal
23	«Uralskaya» («Zh.D. Vokzal»), «Ploshchad 1905 Goda», «Geologicheskaya» («Tsirk» stop), «Chkalovskaya» («Avtovokzal» stop)	Akademgorodok	Zh.D. Vokzal
25	«Ploshchad 1905 Goda» («Ploshchad Malysheva» and «Rubin» stops)	Vysotsky street	MEGA Shopping Center (from 8 am to 10 pm) or Radiotechnika (the rest of the time)
27	«Ploshchad 1905 Goda»	S.T.Ts. Mega (shopping center)	Zh.B.I.
28	«Ploshchad 1905 Goda»	Radiokoledzh	Gorbol'nitsa No. 7 (city hospital)
030	«Ploshchad 1905 Goda», «Geologicheskaya» («Tsirk» stop), «Chkalovskaya» («Avtovokzal» stop), «Botanicheskaya»	Avangard	Okrainnaya street
32	«Ploshchad 1905 Goda»	Drama Theater	Kompressorny microdistrict
48	«Ploshchad 1905 Goda»	Gorbol'nitsa No. 7 (city hospital)	Shirokaya Rechka
50	«Ploshchad 1905 Goda», «Geologicheskaya» («Tsirk» stop), «Chkalovskaya» («Avtovokzal» stop)	Ural Federal University	17th Mekhkolonna
052	«Ploshchad 1905 Goda»	Zh.K. Poles'ye	Gorbol'nitsa No. 7 (city hospital)
54	«Ploshchad 1905 Goda», «Geologicheskaya» («Tsirk» stop), «Chkalovskaya» («Avtovokzal» stop)	Ural Federal University	Krasnolesye
054	«Ploshchad 1905 Goda», «Geologicheskaya» («Tsirk» stop), «Chkalovskaya» («Avtovokzal» stop)	Solnechny Microdistrict	Siniye Kamni
056	«Uralskaya» (остановка «ЖД Вокзал»), «Ploshchad 1905 Goda», «Geologicheskaya» («Tsirk» stop), «Chkalovskaya» («Avtovokzal» stop)	Sosnovy bor	Uralobuv'
57	«Uralskaya» («Vokzalnaya» stop), «Ploshchad 1905 Goda», «Geologicheskaya» («Tsirk» stop), «Chkalovskaya» («Avtovokzal» stop)	Pekhotintsev street	Elizavet
57А	«Uralskaya» («Vokzalnaya» stop), «Ploshchad 1905 Goda», «Geologicheskaya» («Tsirk» stop), «Chkalovskaya» («Avtovokzal» stop)	2nd Novosibirskaya street	DMB No. 9
61	«Ploshchad 1905 Goda»	Pekhotintsev	40 Let Vlksm
64	«Ploshchad 1905 Goda»	Michurinsky (settlement)	Kompressorny microdistrict
070	«Ploshchad 1905 Goda»	Uchiteley	Pavla Shamanova street
0152	«Ploshchad 1905 Goda»	Drama theater	Berezovsky

Trams
No.	toward metro station	End Point 1	End Point 2
2	«Prospekt Kosmonavtov», «Mashinostroiteley» («Peduniversitet» stop), «Ploshchad 1905 Goda»	Frezerovshchikov street	VIZ (Vizovsky residential area)
6	«Ploshchad 1905 Goda»	Mayakovsky Central Park of Culture and Leisure	Mashinostoiteley street
7	«Ploshchad 1905 Goda»	7 Klyuchey	Elmash
13	«Ploshchad 1905 Goda»	7 Klyuchey residential area	40 Let Vlksm street
15	«Ploshchad 1905 Goda», «Geologicheskaya» («Tsirk» stop), «Chkalovskaya» («Avtovokzal» stop)	Vtorchemet residential area	40 Let Vlksm street
18	«Ploshchad 1905 Goda»	VIZ (Vizovsky residential area)	Shartash
23	«Uralmash (Yekaterinburg Metro)», «Mashinostroiteley» («Peduniversitet» stop), «Ploshchad 1905 Goda»	Mashinostroiteley	40 Let Vlksm street
26	«Ploshchad 1905 Goda»	Volgogradskaya street	Ural Federal University
27	«Uralskaya» («Zh.D. Vokzal» stop), «Ploshchad 1905 Goda», «Geologicheskaya» («Tsirk» stop), «Chkalovskaya» («Avtovokzal» stop)	Keramicheskaya	Zh.D. Vokzal

Trolleybuses
No.	toward metro station	End Point 1	End Point 2
3	«Prospekt Kosmonavtov», «Uralmash (Yekaterinburg Metro)», «Mashinostroiteley» («Peduniversitet» stop), «Uralskaya» («Zh.D. Vokzal» stop), «Ploshchad 1905 Goda» («Ploshchad Malysheva» and «Rubin» stops),	Kommunisticheskaya street	Kraulya street
7	«Ploshchad 1905 Goda» («Ploshchad Malysheva» and «Rubin» stops)	Posadskaya street	Akademicheskaya
15	«Botanicheskaya», «Ploshchad 1905 Goda» («Ploshchad Malysheva» and «Rubin» stops)	Botanicheskaya	Kraulya street

== See also ==
- «Ulitsa 1905 Goda» Station in Moscow.
