= Geologicheskaya =

Yekaterinburg Metro Station

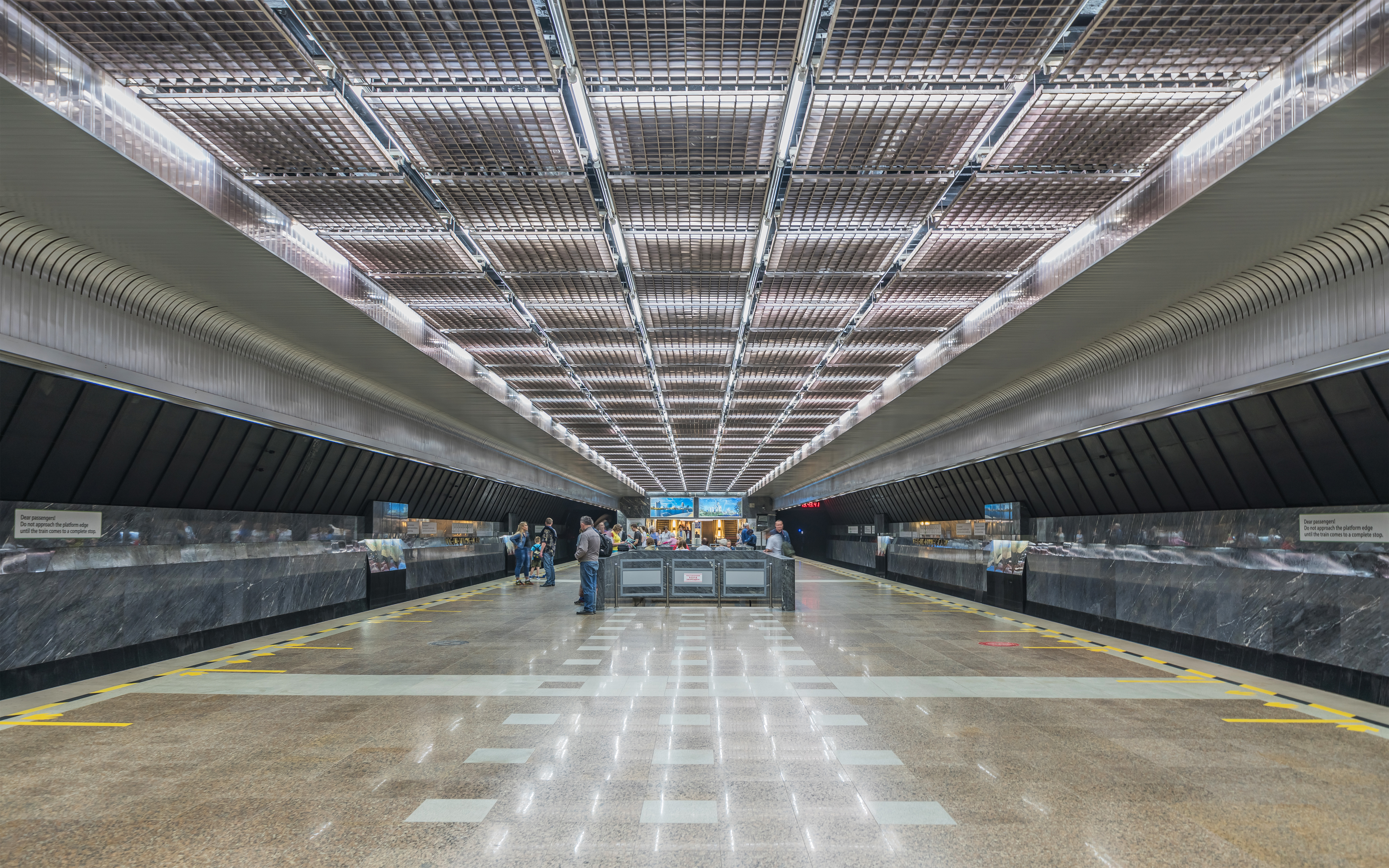

General information
- Coordinates: 56.827222°N 60.603333°E
- System: Yekaterinburg Metro
- Line: First line
- Platforms: 1
- Tracks: 2

Construction
- Structure type: Island

History
- Opened: 30 December 2002

Services
Preceding station	Yekaterinburg Metro	Following station
Ploshchad 1905 Goda towards Prospekt Kosmonavtov	First Line	Chkalovskaya towards Botanicheskaya
Route map
Location

Geologicheskaya (Russian: Геологическая) is the 7th station of the Yekaterinburg Metro and was opened on December 30, 2002. It is situated in the central part of the city at the intersection of 8th Marta street and Kuybysheva street between metro stations "Ploshchad 1905 Goda" and "Chkalovskaya". The main building of Ural State University of Economics and the Yekaterinburg Circus are near the station's entrance. After the opening of the exit to the Greenwich shopping center, it became the first deep-level station of the Yekaterinburg metro with two lobbies (before that there were only shallow stations located at the edges of the line and in the first section).

== Name ==
The project name of the station was "Kuybyshevskaya". The modern name was assigned by the Sverdlovsk Regional Committee of the CPSU B.N. Yeltsin and the Sverdlovsk Executive Committee A.A. Mekhrentsev, at the request of the staff of Uralgeologiya due to the fact that in the area of the metro station there is an administration building, where outstanding geologists of the Urals, and discoverers of deposits worked, as well as the Sverdlovsk Mining Institute.

== Construction history ==
- December 1989 — construction of the station began.
- January 1996 — connection of a running tunnel to the side of the station «Ploshchad 1905 Goda».
- April 1997 — a hunger strike by the station builders.
- August 1997 — reconstruction of the intersection at streets 8th Marta and Kuybysheva in connection with construction of an underground passage to the station.
- December 1997 — the construction of a revolving exit ended. 20,000 м³ of soil was removed during the construction of the underground vestibule, about 10,000 м³ more remain to be removed, the development was carried out with the help of a "Paurat" combine. The City Administration transferred 61.2 billion rubles for 1997 for construction (non-denominated, instead of planned 52), the Government of the Region - 31 (instead of 69), and the shortfall from the federal budget - 99.
- February 1998 — by the end of the month, the Yekaterinburg Administration paid off 4-month wage arrears (after another strike of metro builders).
- March 1998 — after the trip of the management of the metro builders to Moscow, 25 billion rubles were transferred to St. Petersburg for the construction of 4 escalators.
- September 1998 — two ground station lobbies were partly designed.
- September 1999 — out of 2000 Metrostroy employees, 500 were cut, the rest were sent to complete the construction of the station.
- March 1, 2001 — at the declaration of the new director of Metrostroy V. Infantiev, and after another suspension, construction work resumed.
- December 21, 2001 — underpasses leading to the station were opened, the opening of the station itself was postponed to June 2002.
- December 30, 2002 — the station opened for passengers.
- January 10, 2003 — the official opening of the station took place (with the participation of the Governor of the Sverdlovsk Region Eduard Rossel, the chairman of the regional government A. P. Vorobyov, the head of Yekaterinburg, etc.).
- November 27, 2011 — during the day, the station was temporarily closed for docking of the new Geologicheskaya - Botanicheskaya section.
- April 2015 — construction began on the second inclined passage from the station, with exits located in the shopping center "Greenwich" and near the Dendrological Park.
- July 22, 2019 — an additional entrance to the Geologicheskaya metro station from the Greenwich shopping center was opened

== Design ==
The transfer hub station has a three-tiered structure: on the upper tier - there are service rooms, on the middle tier - the station of the first line, and on the lower tier - the station of the third line. On the station platform, there are two flights of stairs going down under the station for transferring to the future station of the third line. The station is single-span, and has a flat suspended ceiling, with modern lighting. The walls are decorated with Florentine mosaics imitating a cut of the Earth's crust. Mosaics were made at the "Ural Gems" plant.

There is a memorial plaque in the station lobby with a list of the names of prominent geologists of the Urals. The walls of the platform are decorated with panels made of Ural stone. Turnstiles of a new model for Yekaterinburg are installed in the station lobby. The lobby is located at the intersection of the streets 8th Marta and Kuybysheva, near the circus.

It was planned that from December 2016 the station will have two lobbies with 6 exits, but the northern lobby, built into the Greenwich shopping center, did not open until July 22, 2019.

== Transfers and ground public transportation ==
The southern lobby of the station has six exits - on all four sides of the intersection of 8th Marta and Kuybysheva streets to stops for buses, trams, and taxi routes. It is interesting to note that the underground passage, to which this lobby is attached, was opened a year earlier than the station itself - on December 20, 2001 (the "Geologicheskaya" itself was opened on December 30, 2002). Initially, this crossing had only five exits - two at the Circus (on the southeastern side of the intersection of 8 Marta and Kuibyshev streets), two at the southwest and one at the northwest corners of this intersection. In 2017, new links appeared at this crossing, leading to the northeastern side of the intersection of 8th Marta and Kuibyshev and to the Greenwich shopping center. At the end of July 2019, a second, northern lobby appeared at the station, which can only be accessed from the Greenwich shopping center (it is attached to the lower (underground) floor of the said shopping center). Another interesting feature of the new lobby is that it is not connected to the station hall by a continuous inclined escalator tunnel, but by a cascade of three inclined escalator tunnels with transitions between them, and one of these three inclined tunnels is perpendicular to the other two. From "Greenwich" you can get to the south lobby of the station via the above-mentioned underground passage.

Tables: public transport routes (data as of May 2020)

Buses
No.	toward metro station	End Point 1	End Point 2
011	«Ploshchad 1905 Goda», «Geologicheskaya» («Tsirk» stop), «Chkalovskaya» («Avtovokzal» stop)	Pekhotintsev	T.Ts. Lerua Merlen (Leroy Merlin shopping center (hardware store))
012	«Ploshchad 1905 Goda», «Geologicheskaya» («Tsirk» stop), «Chkalovskaya» («Avtovokzal» stop), «Botanicheskaya»	Elizavet	Pavla Shamanova street
014	«Ploshchad 1905 Goda», «Geologicheskaya» («Tsirk» stop), «Chkalovskaya» («Avtovokzal» stop)	T.Ts. Lenta (shopping center)	DMB No. 9
016	«Ploshchad 1905 Goda», «Geologicheskaya» («Tsirk» stop), «Chkalovskaya» («Avtovokzal» stop), «Botanicheskaya»	DMB No. 9	Yuzhnaya podstantsiya (South substation)
018	«Ploshchad 1905 Goda», «Geologicheskaya» («Tsirk» stop), «Chkalovskaya» («Avtovokzal» stop)	17th Mekhkalonka	Avangard
019	«Ploshchad 1905 Goda», «Geologicheskaya» («Tsirk» stop), «Chkalovskaya» («Avtovokzal» stop), «Botanicheskaya»	Elizavet	Pavla Shamanova street
23	«Uralskaya» («Zh.D. Vokzal» stop), «Ploshchad 1905 Goda», «Geologicheskaya» («Tsirk» stop), «Chkalovskaya» («Avtovokzal» stop)	Akademgorodok	Zh.D. Vokzal
030	«Ploshchad 1905 Goda», «Geologicheskaya» («Tsirk» stop), «Chkalovskaya» («Avtovokzal» stop), «Botanicheskaya»	Avangard	Okrainnaya street
46	«Geologicheskaya»	Pavla Shamanova street	Pavla Shamanova street (circle)
047	«Geologicheskaya» («Tsirk» stop), «Chkalovskaya» («Avtovokzal» stop)	Gromova street	Traktovaya street
50	«Ploshchad 1905 Goda», «Geologicheskaya» («Tsirk» stop), «Chkalovskaya» («Avtovokzal» stop)	Ural Federal University	17th Mekhkolonna
54	«Ploshchad 1905 Goda», «Geologicheskaya» («Tsirk» stop), «Chkalovskaya» («Avtovokzal» stop)	Ural Federal University	Krasnolesye
57	«Uralskaya» («Vokzalnaya» stop), «Ploshchad 1905 Goda», «Geologicheskaya» («Tsirk» stop), «Chkalovskaya» («Avtovokzal» stop),	Pekhotintsev street	Elizavet
57А	«Uralskaya» («Vokzalnaya» stop), «Ploshchad 1905 Goda», «Geologicheskaya» («Tsirk» stop), «Chkalovskaya» («Avtovokzal» stop),	Pekhotintsev street	Elizavet
—	«Geologicheskaya»	Karsyeozersky-2	T.R.Ts. Grinvich (shopping and entertainment center)

Trams
No.	toward metro station	End Point 1	End Point 2
1	«Geologicheskaya» («Tsirk» stop), «Chkalovskaya» («Avtovokzal» stop)	VIZ (Vizovsky residential area)	Vtorchermet Microdistrict
3	«Uralskaya» («Zh.D. Vokzal» stop), «Geologicheskaya» («Tsirk» stop)	Mayakovsky Central Park of Culture and Leisure	VIZ (Vizovsky residential area)
5	«Uralmash (Yekaterinburg Metro)», «Mashinostroiteley» («Peduniversitet» stop), «Uralskaya» («Zh.D. Vokzal» stop), «Geologicheskaya» («Tsirk» stop), «Chkalovskaya» («Avtovokzal» stop), «Botanicheskaya»	UZTM (Uralmash factory)	Metro station «Botanicheskaya»
9	«Geologicheskaya» («Tsirk» stop), «Chkalovskaya» («Avtovokzal» stop)	Mayakovsky Central Park of Culture and Leisure	Keramicheskaya
10	«Geologicheskaya» («Tsirk» stop)	Mayakovsky Central Park of Culture and Leisure	7 Klyuchey Microdistrict
14	«Mashinostroiteley» («Peduniversitet» stop), «Geologicheskaya» («Tsirk» stop), «Chkalovskaya» («Avtovokzal» stop)	Elmash	Keramicheskaya
15	«Ploshchad 1905 Goda», «Geologicheskaya» («Tsirk» stop), «Chkalovskaya» («Avtovokzal» stop)	Vtorchermet Microdistrict	40 Let Vlksm street
21	«Uralskaya» («Zh.D. Vokzal» stop), «Geologicheskaya» («Tsirk» stop)	Mayakovsky Central Park of Culture and Leisure	Kirova street
25	«Prospekt Kosmonavtov (Yekaterinburg Metro)», «Mashinostroiteley» («Peduniversitet» stop), «Geologicheskaya» («Tsirk» stop), «Chkalovskaya» («Avtovokzal» stop)	Frezerovshchikov street	Keramicheskaya
27	«Uralskaya» («Zh.D. Vokzal» stop), «Ploshchad 1905 Goda», «Geologicheskaya» («Tsirk» stop), «Chkalovskaya» («Avtovokzal» stop)	Keramicheskaya	Zh.D. Vokzal
32	«Uralskaya» («Zh.D. Vokzal» stop), «Geologicheskaya» («Tsirk» stop)	Dvorets Sporta (Palace of Sports)	40 Let Vlksm street
33	«Geologicheskaya» («Tsirk» stop)	Dvorets Sporta	Mayakovsky Central Park of Culture and Leisure
