= Yekaterinburg Circus =

Building in Yekaterinburg, Russia

Coordinates: 56°49′33″N 60°36′19″E

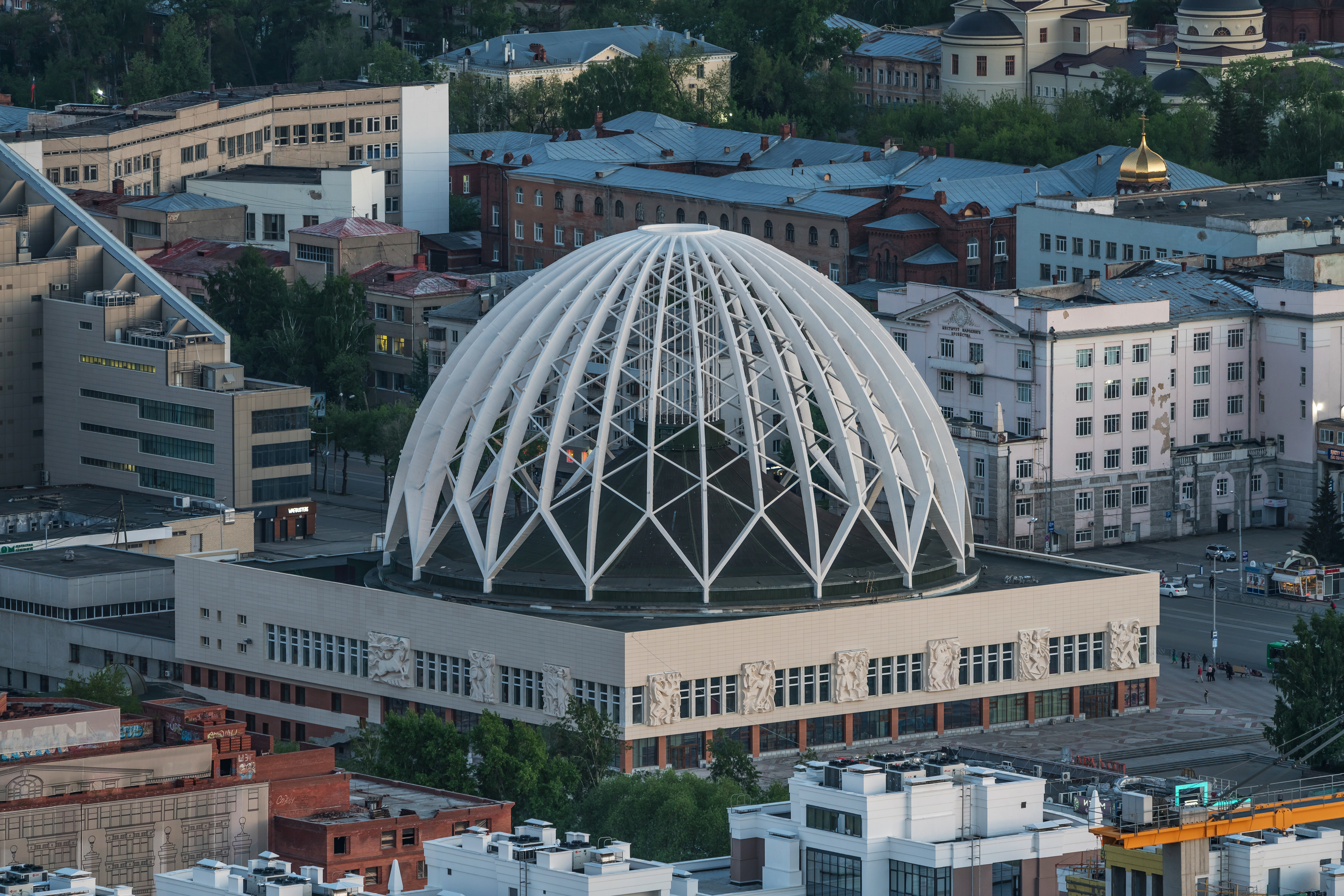
The circus, view from Vysotsky (skyscraper)

Yekaterinburg Circus is a circus building for 2,558 spectators in Yekaterinburg, Russia.

== History ==
The building was first opened on February 1, 1980. The building has been under construction for more than 5 years. The author of the draft drawings was the architect Julian Schwarzbrein.

== Directors ==
- 1983-1993 – Евгений Живов
- 1994-2019 – Анатолий Марчевский
