= Uralmash (disambiguation) =

Uralmash is a heavy machine building plant in Yekaterinburg, Russia.

Uralmash may also refer to:

- Uralmash metro station, a station of the Yekaterinburg Metro, Yekaterinburg, Russia
- FC Ural Sverdlovsk Oblast was known as Uralmash until 2002
- Uralmash gang, a Russian mafia crime syndicate based in the city of Yekaterinburg.
