= SKB-Bank Arena =

Stadium in Yekaterinburg, Russia

Stadium of the Academy of FC Ural
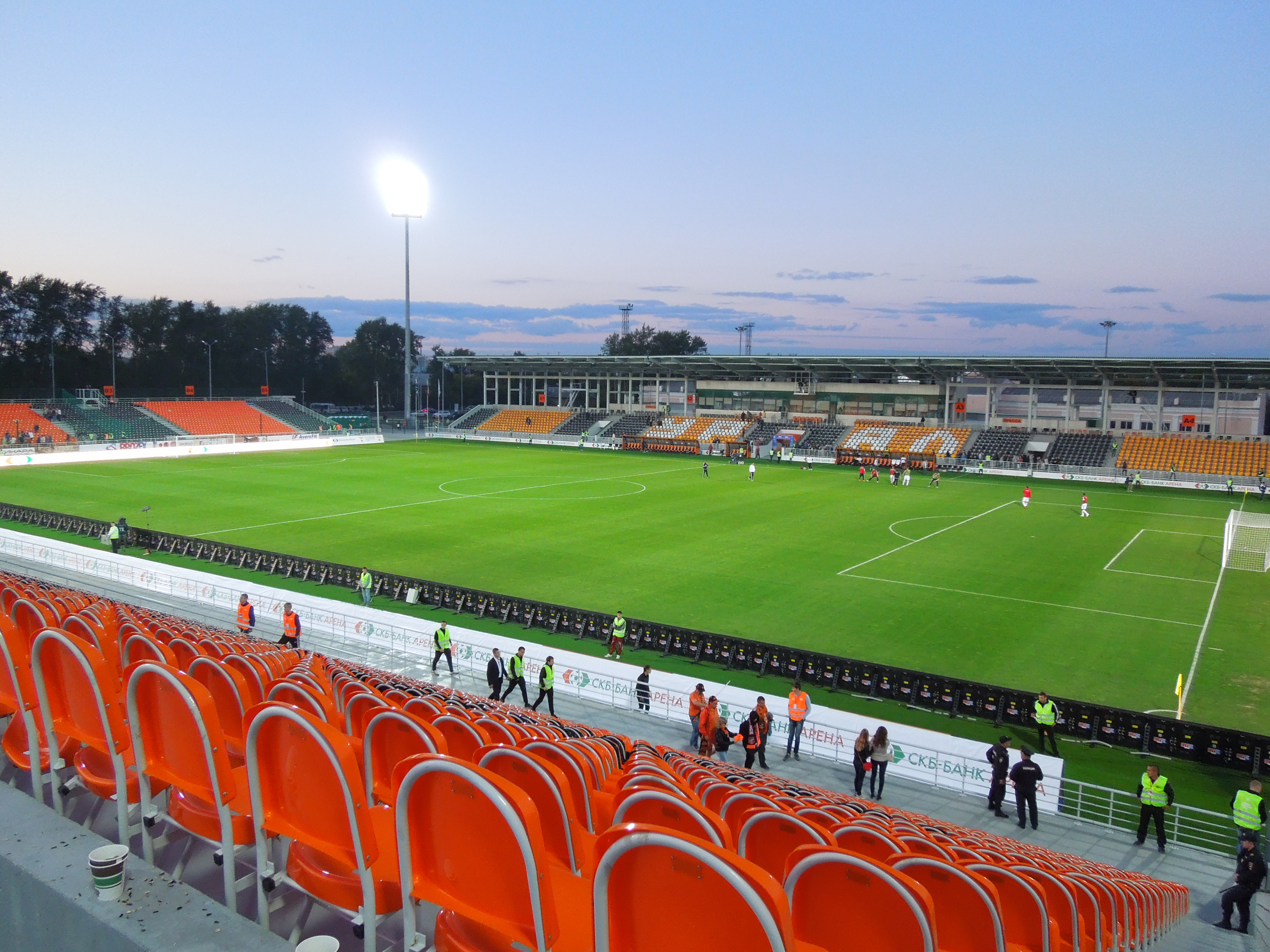
- SKB-Bank Arena in 2015
- Interactive map of Stadium of the Academy of FC Ural
- Full name: Stadium of the Academy of the football club Ural
- Address: 8 Festivalnaya Street, Yekaterinburg, Russia
- Location: Yekaterinburg, Russia
- Coordinates: 56°53′40″N 60°34′41″E
- Owner: Government of the Sverdlovsk region
- Operator: FC Ural Yekaterinburg
- Capacity: 10,000
- Surface: Grass
- Field size: 115x68 m
- Public transit: Uralmash (Yekaterinburg Metro); Prospekt Kosmonavtov

Construction
- Built: 1934
- Renovated: 2015

Tenant
- FK Ural U19

Website
- urfaso.ru/texts/show_group/stadion_

Stadium of the Academy of FC Ural (Russian: Стадион Академии ФК «Урал»), originally called Uralmash Stadium (Russian: «Уралмаш»), is a multi-use stadium in Yekaterinburg, Russia. It is currently used mostly for football matches and is the home ground of FC Ural Sverdlovsk Oblast also known as FC Ural Yekaterinburg. The stadium holds 10,000 people.

== History ==
=== Soviet era ===
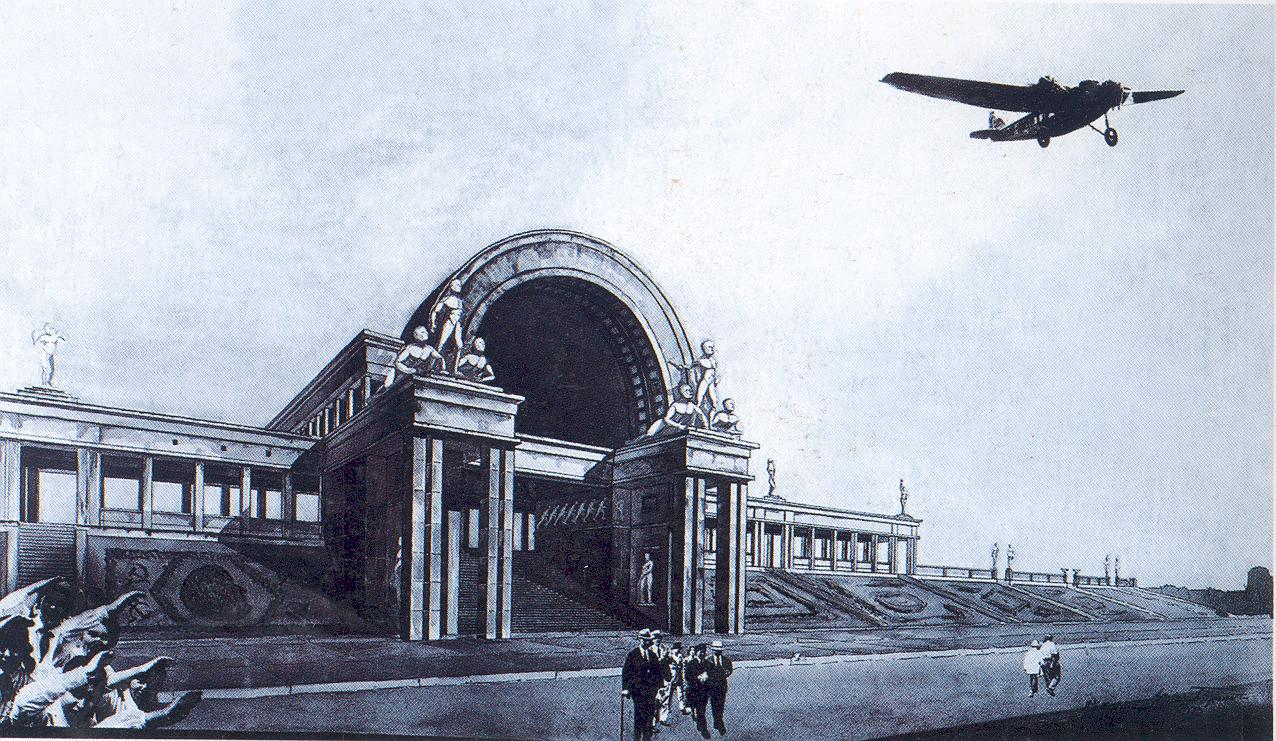
The original stadium design presented by Pyotr Oransky in 1934

The construction of the stadium is closely linked to the history of the Uralmash plant and the Uralmash neighborhood. Since the early 1930s, a vibrant sports culture emerged among the builders and workers around the future giant factory. Organized sporting events in volleyball, football, and athletics began in 1932, initially held near the factory's workshops. A small venue, known as "Uralmashstroy Stadium," was built by Uralmashstroy for these events, becoming the first sports facility in the young neighborhood.

As the factory and area expanded, a more modern sports base was needed. In 1934, the factory leadership allocated 150,000 rubles for a new stadium, designed by architect Pyotr Oransky. The original design was deemed "excessively pompous," leading to modifications. Construction utilized materials from the factory, creating embankments for the future stands, and was completed in May 1934. At its opening, the Uralmash Plant Stadium had a seating capacity of 18,000, making it the fourth largest in the USSR at the time, with a beautifully adorned pavilion.

The grand opening took place on May 30, 1934, attracting local families, as the arena was surrounded by dense forest. Attendees navigated by the White Tower of the factory. The event included speeches and demonstrations by athletes, culminating in a friendly match between factory teams, ending 5-2.

The stadium was surrounded by stands on three sides, with an administrative building housing sports halls and changing rooms on the fourth side. It became a venue for various sports and cultural events, including the first all-factory Spartakiad from August 24–30 and friendly football matches in the fall.

A significant event occurred on September 25, 1935, when the stadium hosted a major autumn festival featuring athletes, including French middle-distance runner Jules Ladoumègue. During this time, the young Uralmash team (now FC Ural) began playing at the stadium until the 1960s when most local matches moved to the Central Stadium.

In late 1968, construction began on a large athletic arena next to the stadium, which officially opened on May 10, 1973.

=== Russian period ===
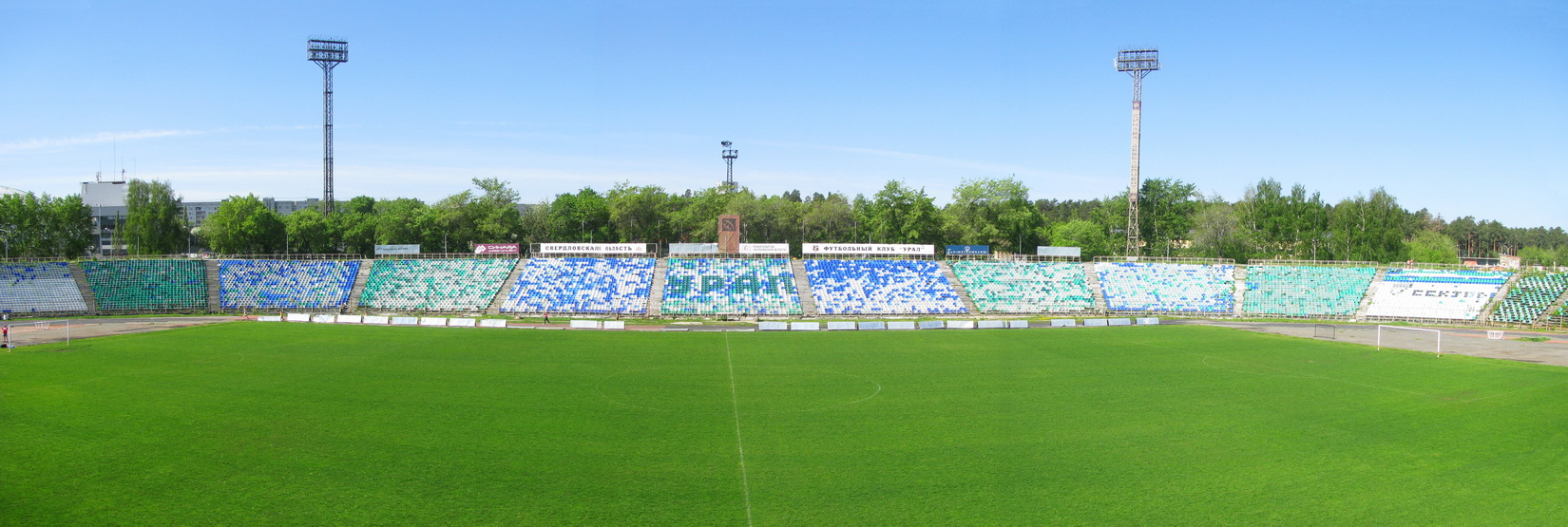
Uralmash Stadium after the 2003 renovation

In 1993, due to a severe economic crisis, the Uralmash sports club was dissolved, which had originally led to the construction of the entire sports complex, including the stadium. From the early 1960s to the early 1990s, FC Uralmash played at their home stadium only a few times, mostly holding matches at the Yekaterinburg Central Stadium. However, during the Russian era, the team began to play more frequently at Uralmash, averaging 3-5 official matches annually from 1993, including several in the Russian Premier League.

Starting in the 2001 season, FC Uralmash returned to its home arena. This continued until a renovation in 2003, which saw the installation of plastic seating and heating for the pitch, though the administrative building, running tracks, and staircases were not repaired. By 2014, a technical inspection revealed that the stadium stands were in an emergency state, and the administrative building was only partially suitable for use.

After the stadium's renovation, Ural's matches resumed there regularly, especially while the Central Stadium was being renovated. The Central Stadium officially reopened on August 19, 2011, during a match between FC Ural and FC Khimki. Following this, FC Ural moved back to the Central Stadium.

The last official match at the old Uralmash Stadium occurred on May 3, 2012, against FC Sibir Novosibirsk, as the venue was moved in preparation for the Russian Cup final between FC Dynamo Moscow and FC Rubin Kazan at the Central Stadium on May 9.

=== Reconstruction 2014—2015 ===
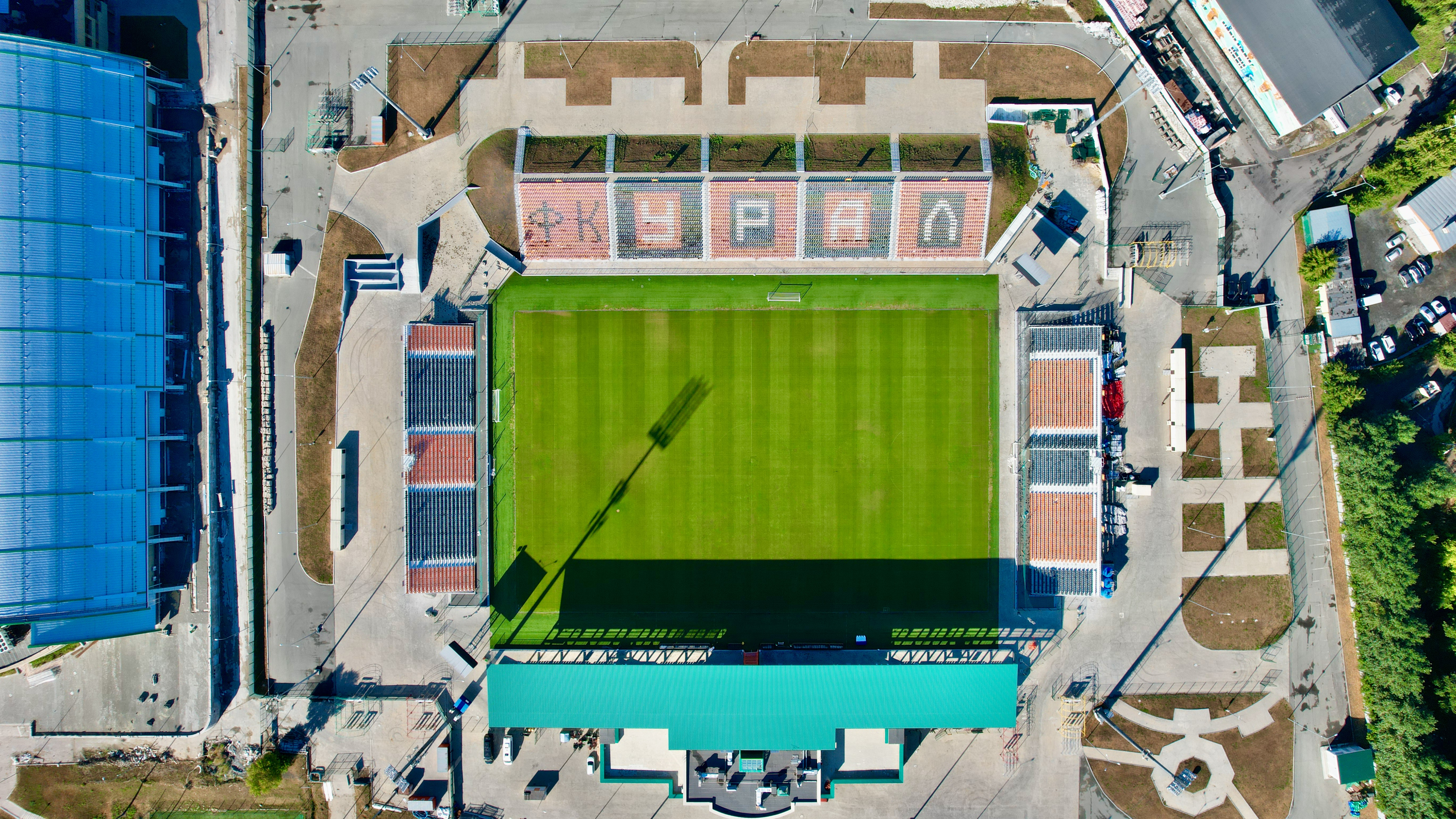
Aerial view of stadium

In 2014, renovations began at the stadium in preparation for the 2018 FIFA World Cup, with a completion deadline set for fall 2015. During an inspection on July 18, led by Governor Yevgeny Kuyvashev and Deputy Prime Minister Valentin Gripas, a more precise deadline was established: the arena needed to be ready by May 15, 2015. By April 2015, it was reported that the renovation was 80% complete, leading to the deadline being moved to June 2015.

At the end of the 2014/2015 season, FC Ural had to find a new stadium for their remaining home matches, including playoff games to remain in the Premier League, as both of their arenas were under renovation. The first two home matches were held at the Ural Football Arena, while the remaining matches took place at the Geolog Stadium in Tyumen.

After a major renovation, the stadium reopened in the summer of 2015. Originally named Uralmash and later renamed SKB-Bank Arena (Russian: «СКБ-Банк Арена»), it became the first venue in Russia built for the 2018 FIFA World Cup. The stadium, officially opened on July 26, 2015 with a Russian Premier League match between FC Ural and FC Zenit. It features high-quality natural grass and has a seating capacity of 10,000.

== Structure ==
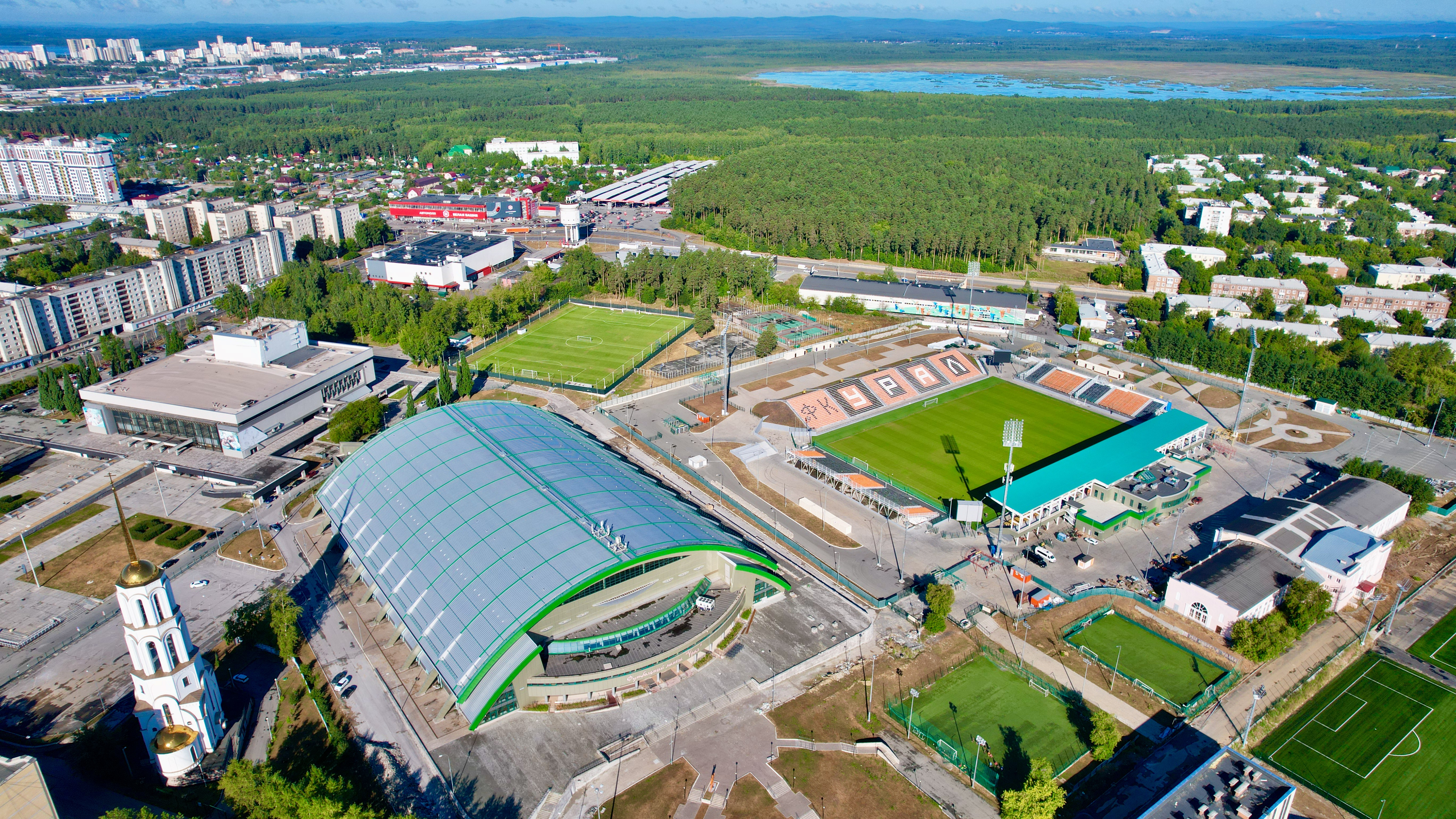
View from above of the indoor arena and stadium

Since its opening and until the 2014-2015 renovation, the stadium was multifunctional, featuring running tracks for athletics. It had a single grandstand on an earthen embankment on three sides, with an administrative building on the fourth side.

After the renovation, the stadium transformed into a dedicated football venue: the running tracks, old administrative building, and the single grandstand were removed. Starting in 2015, the football field was surrounded by four stands. The largest stand, Stand C, remained on the embankment, while new side stands B and D were built with metal modular structures. Each stand is divided into five sectors for better organization and convenience for spectators.

=== Tribunes ===
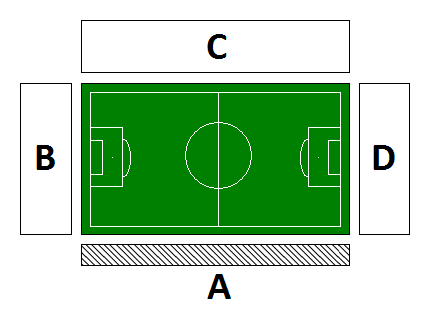
Stadium layout

The stands of the FC Ural Academy Stadium are named after renowned Ural footballers. Stand A is named after Yevgeny Sesyunin, the leader of the Uralmash team, whose goals helped Yekaterinburg reach the top tier of the Soviet Championship for the first time. Stand B honors Sergey Gavrilov, one of the club's top scorers during the Soviet era. Stand C is named after Gennady Sannikov, the record holder for the most matches played for Uralmash. Stand D is dedicated to Viktor Yerokhin, a former player and coach of the club.

The indoor VIP stand has a capacity of 1,600 seats.

=== Football Field ===
The football field measures approximately 105 meters in length and 68 meters in width, with additional meters beyond the touchlines on each side. As part of the renovation for the 2018 FIFA World Cup, the natural grass pitch was equipped with a modern heating and irrigation system.

== Sport ==
After the FIFA World Cup and the return of FC Ural to the Central Stadium, the arena is set to be transferred to the Ural Football Academy. The stadium will become part of a large complex that includes a football training hall, practice fields, as well as a hotel and dormitory. Additionally, the arena is expected to serve as one of the training bases for Ural and the main venue for FC Ural-2 and FK Ural U19 teams.

== Name ==
The stadium was initially called Uralmash Plant Stadium (Russian: Стадион «Уралмашзавода»). It changed names with the factory's football team, becoming Avangard Stadium (Russian: Стадион «Авангард») from 1937 to 1960 and Uralmash Stadium (Russian: Стадион «Уралмаш») from 1960 onward.

After renovations in 2014-2015, it was planned to be named Football Academy Stadium (Russian: Стадион Академии футбола). However, during the renovation's completion, it was decided to sell the naming rights, valued at 25 million rubles. On July 22, 2015, it was renamed SKB-Bank Arena, with the official announcement on July 24. The agreement lasted 2.5 years and was extended for one more year. After the contract expired, the stadium returned to its historic name, Uralmash Stadium, and is currently referred to as the FC Ural Academy Stadium.

== Transport connections ==
=== Rail and Underground ===
Metro: The nearest stations of the Yekaterinburg Metro are Uralmash metro station, located 2.3 km from the stadium, and Prospekt Kosmonavtov, situated 2.4 km away.

Trams: Routes 8 and 24 stop at Kirovgradskaya and Donbasskaya.

=== Public Transport ===
Buses: Route 41 stops at Donbasskaya, and Route 80 stops at Bulvar Kultury.

Trolleybuses: Route 38 also stops at Bulvar Kultury.

=== Onsite parking ===
The parking lot has a capacity of 1000 spaces

== Gallery ==
Before reconstruction

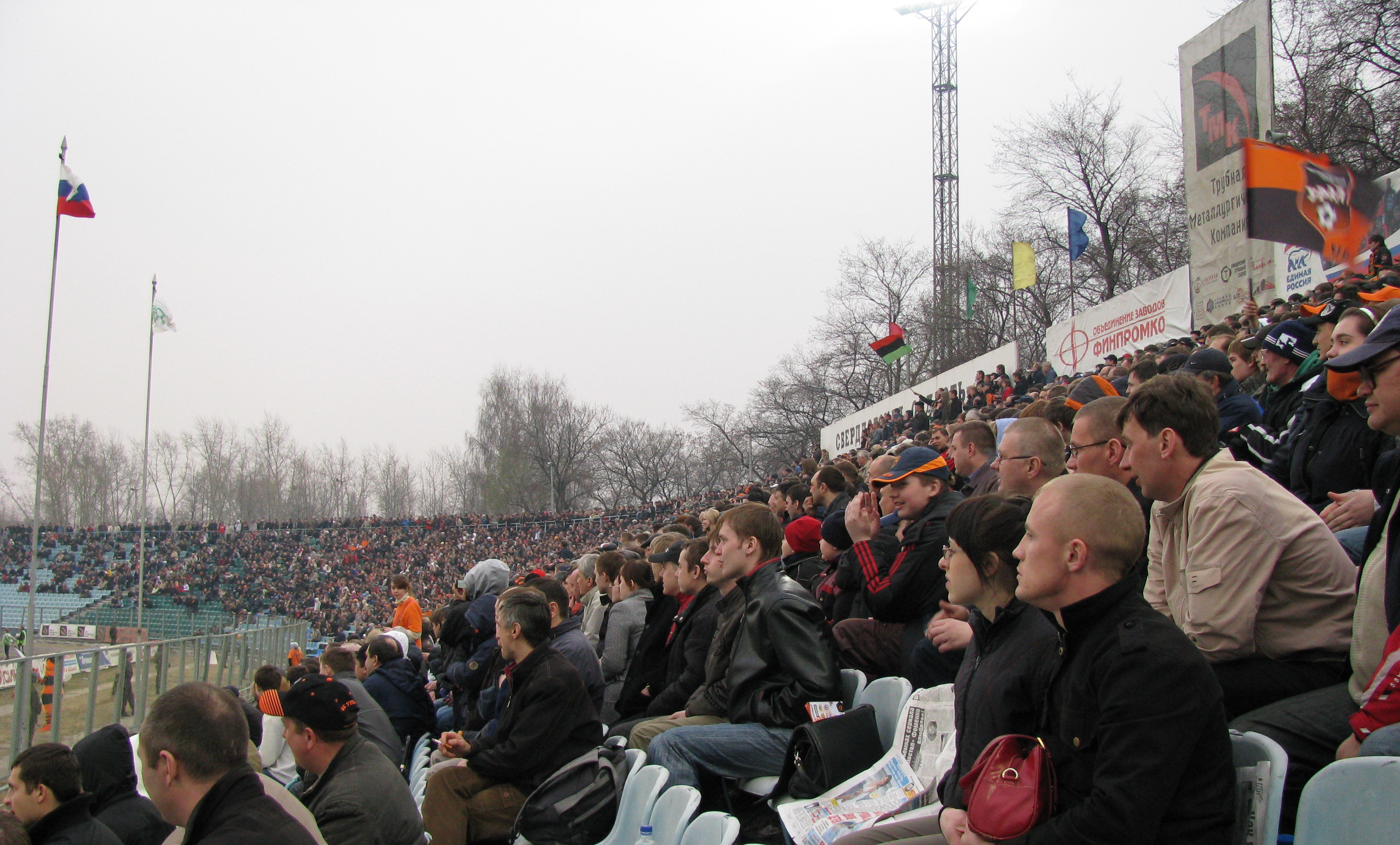
Stands of the Uralmash Stadium during the match between Ural and Rostov, April 22, 2008

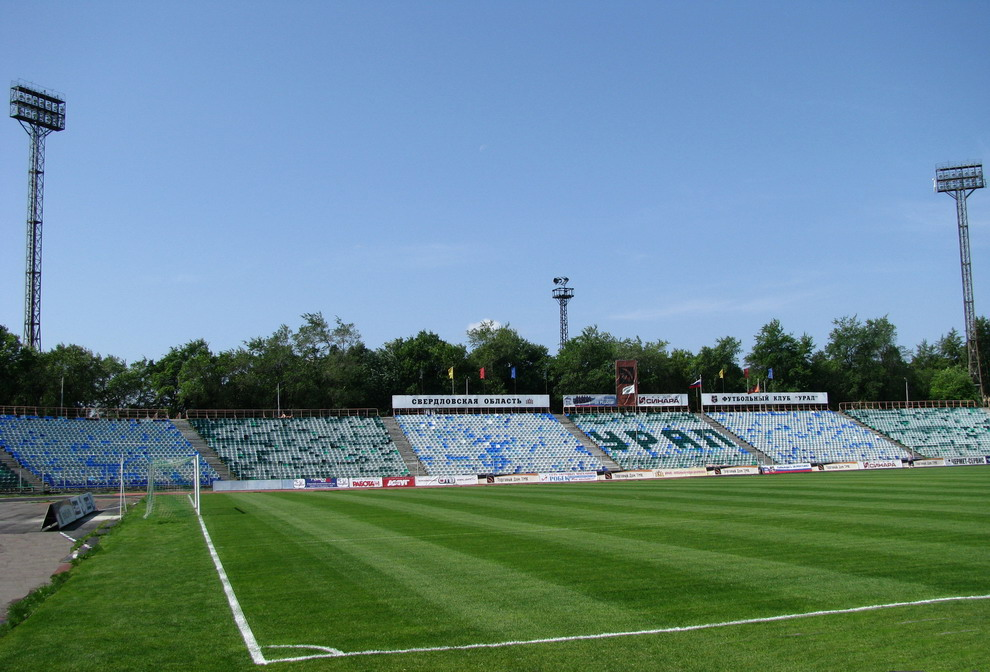
Uralmash Stadium in 2009

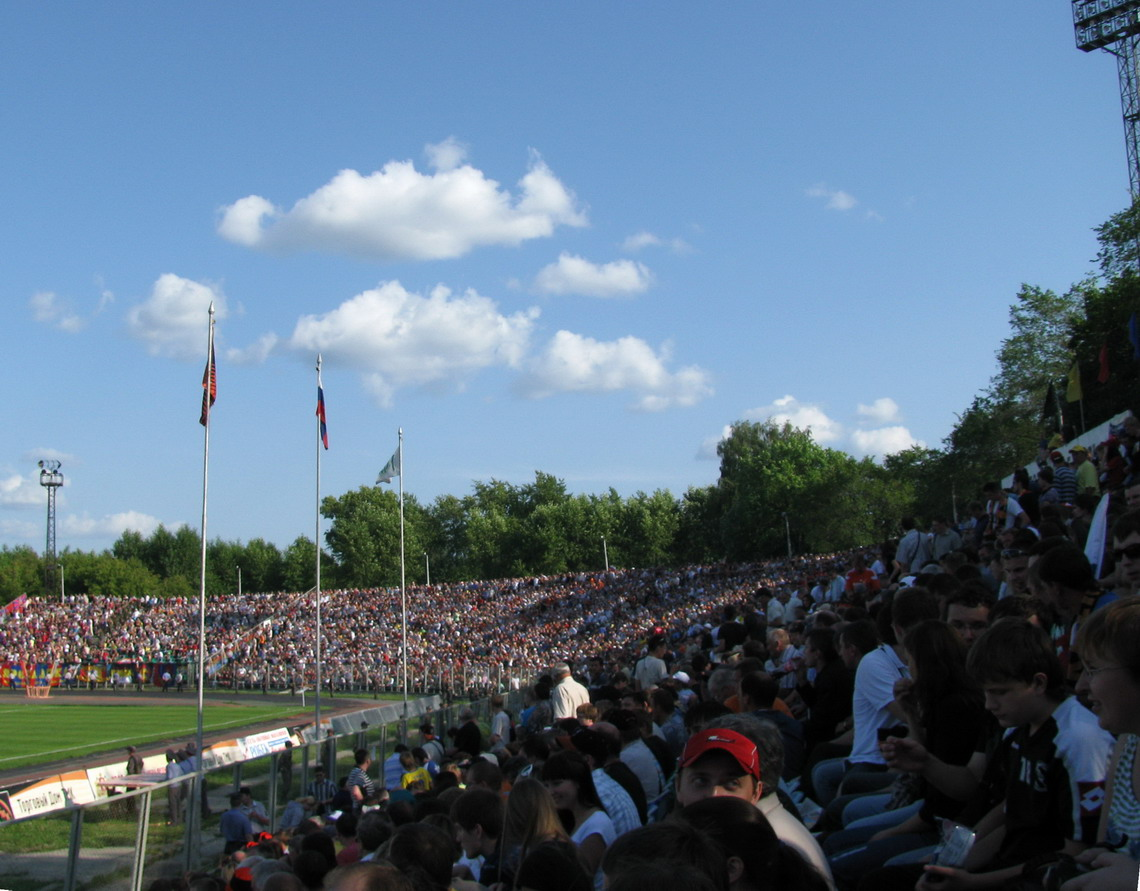
Stands during the match between Ural and CSKA, July 15, 2009

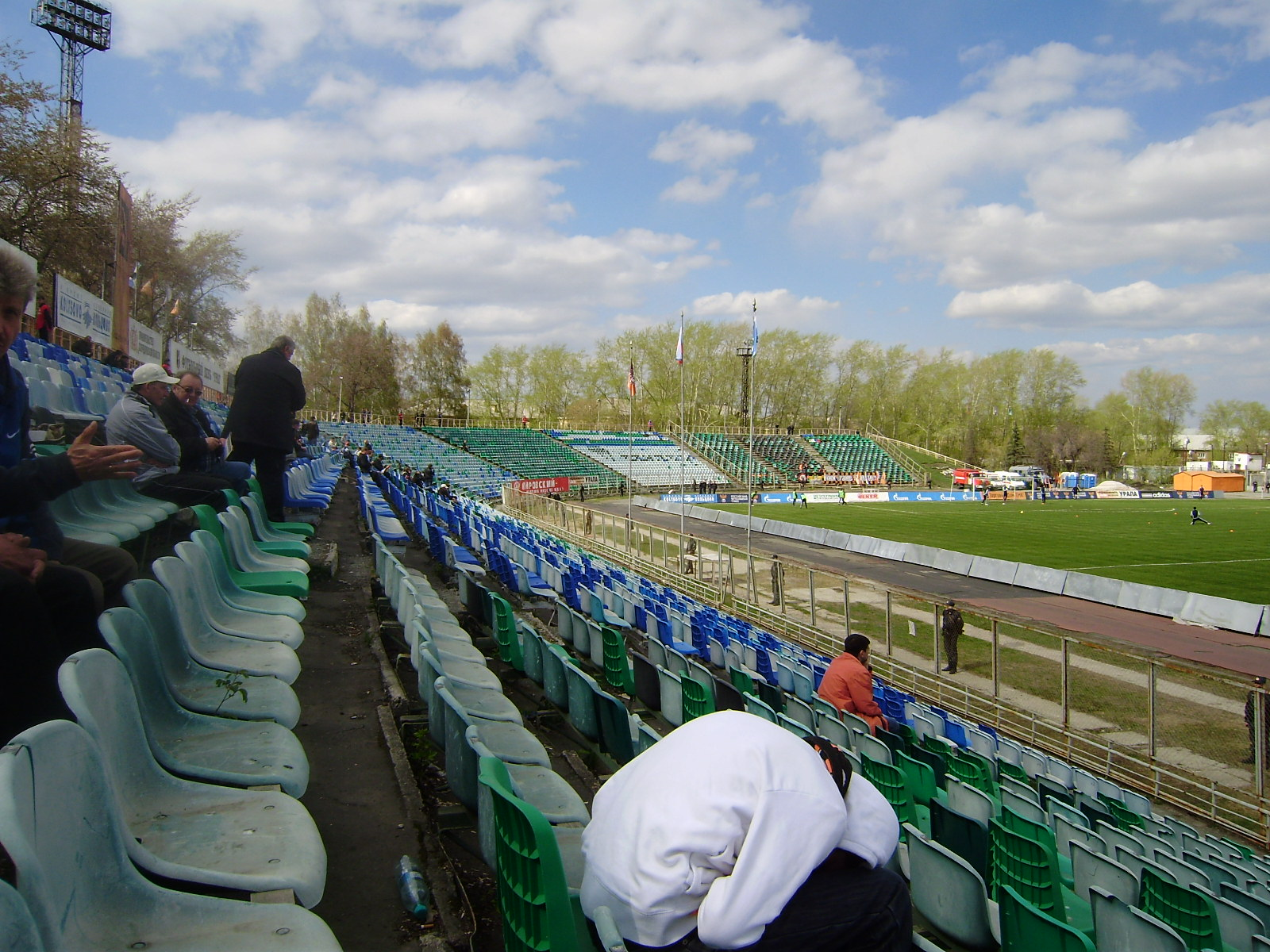
Stands before the match between Ural and Mordovia, May 15, 2011

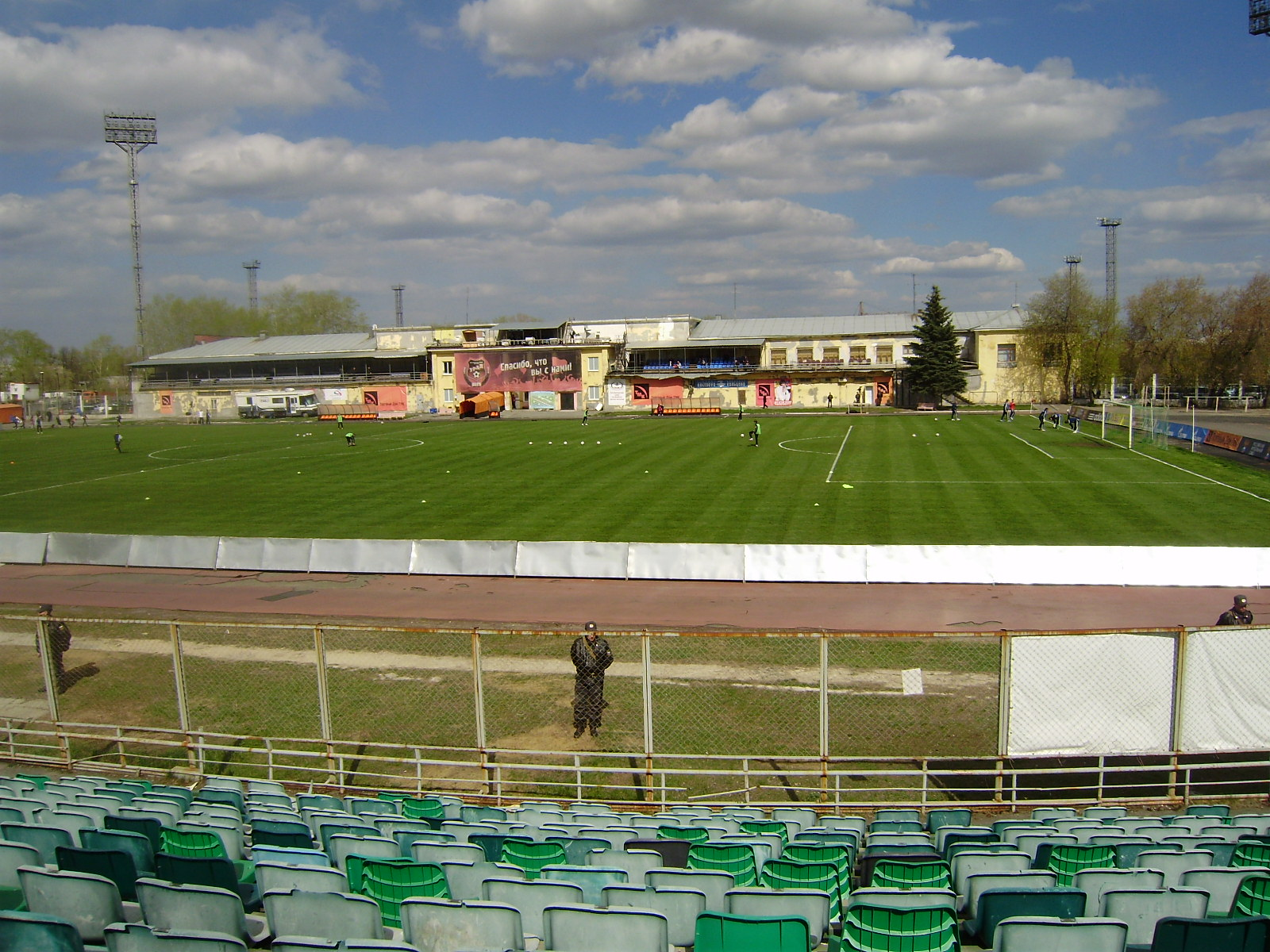
Administrative building at the site of the current Stand A, May 15, 2011

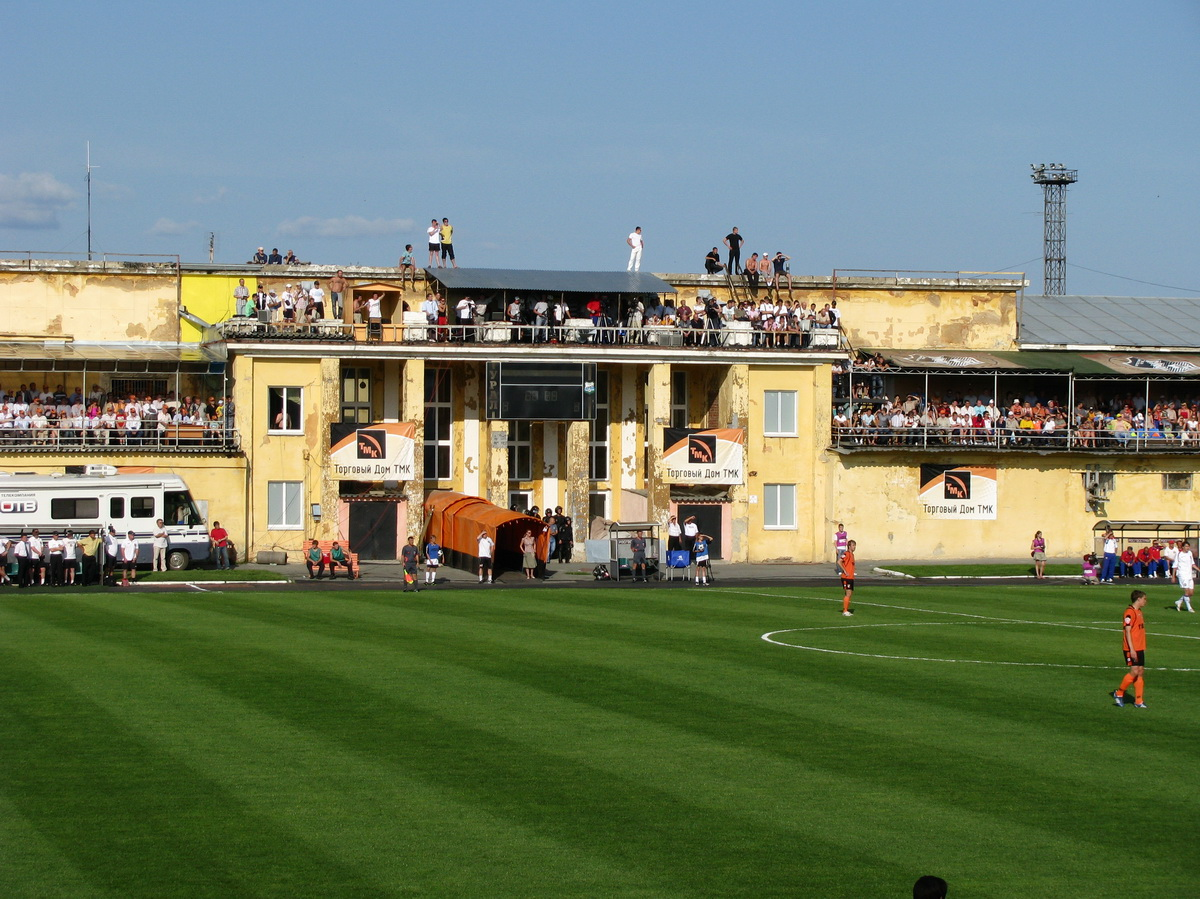
Spectators on the administrative building during the match between Ural and CSKA, July 15, 2009
After reconstruction in 2014-2015

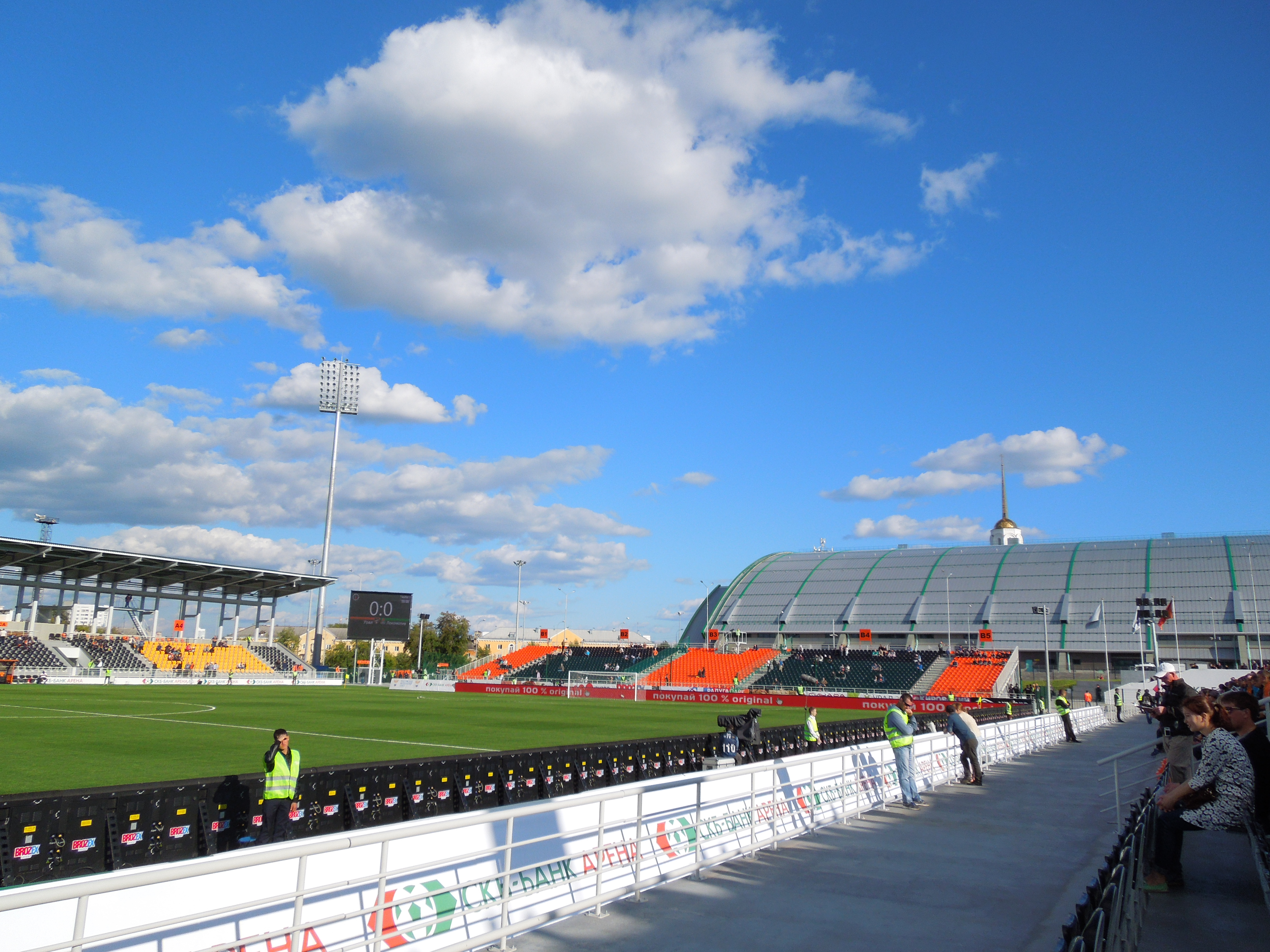
View of Stand B and the Ural football training hall, 2015

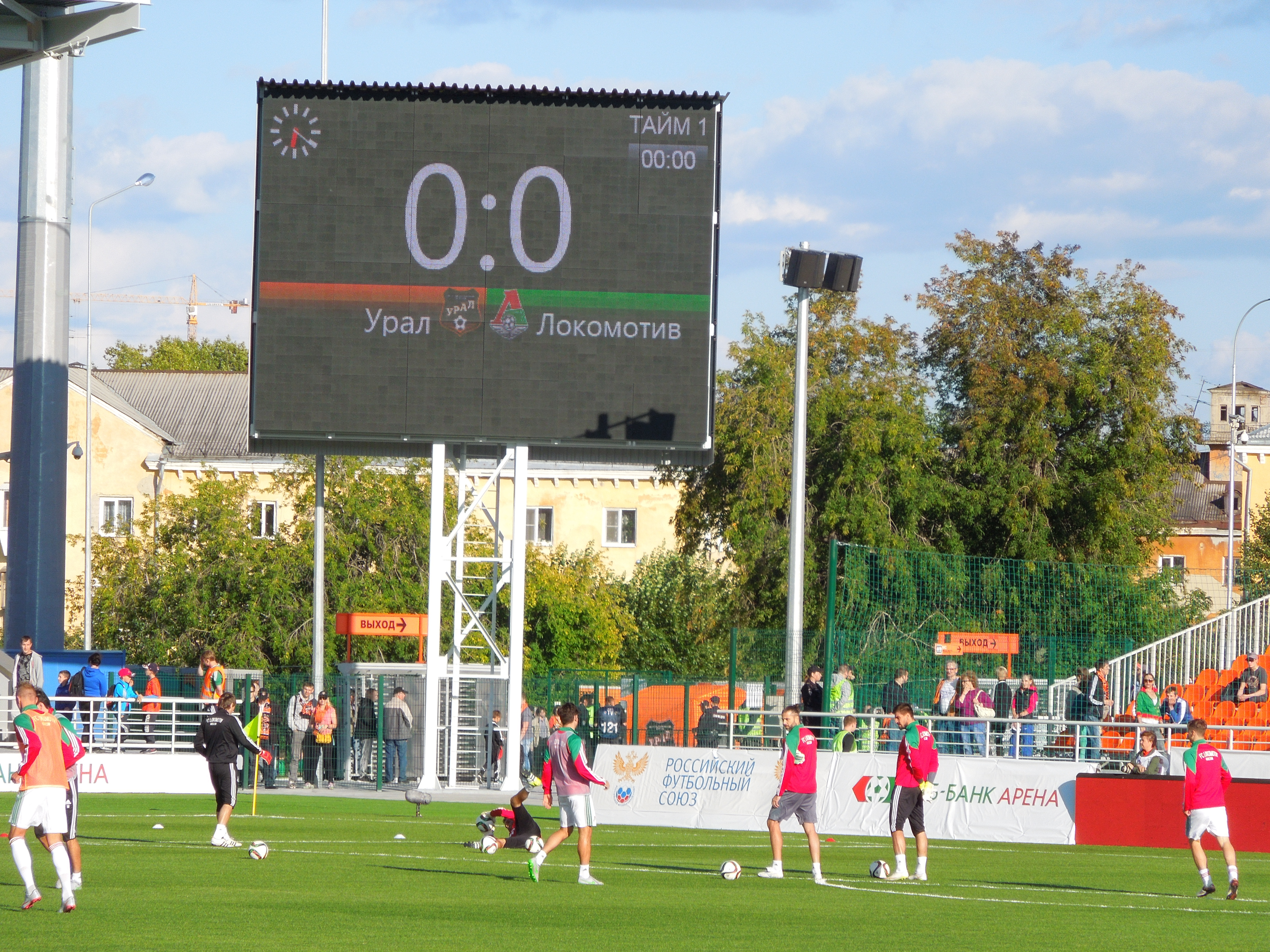
Multimedia scoreboard, Ural vs. Lokomotiv (Moscow), August 8, 2015

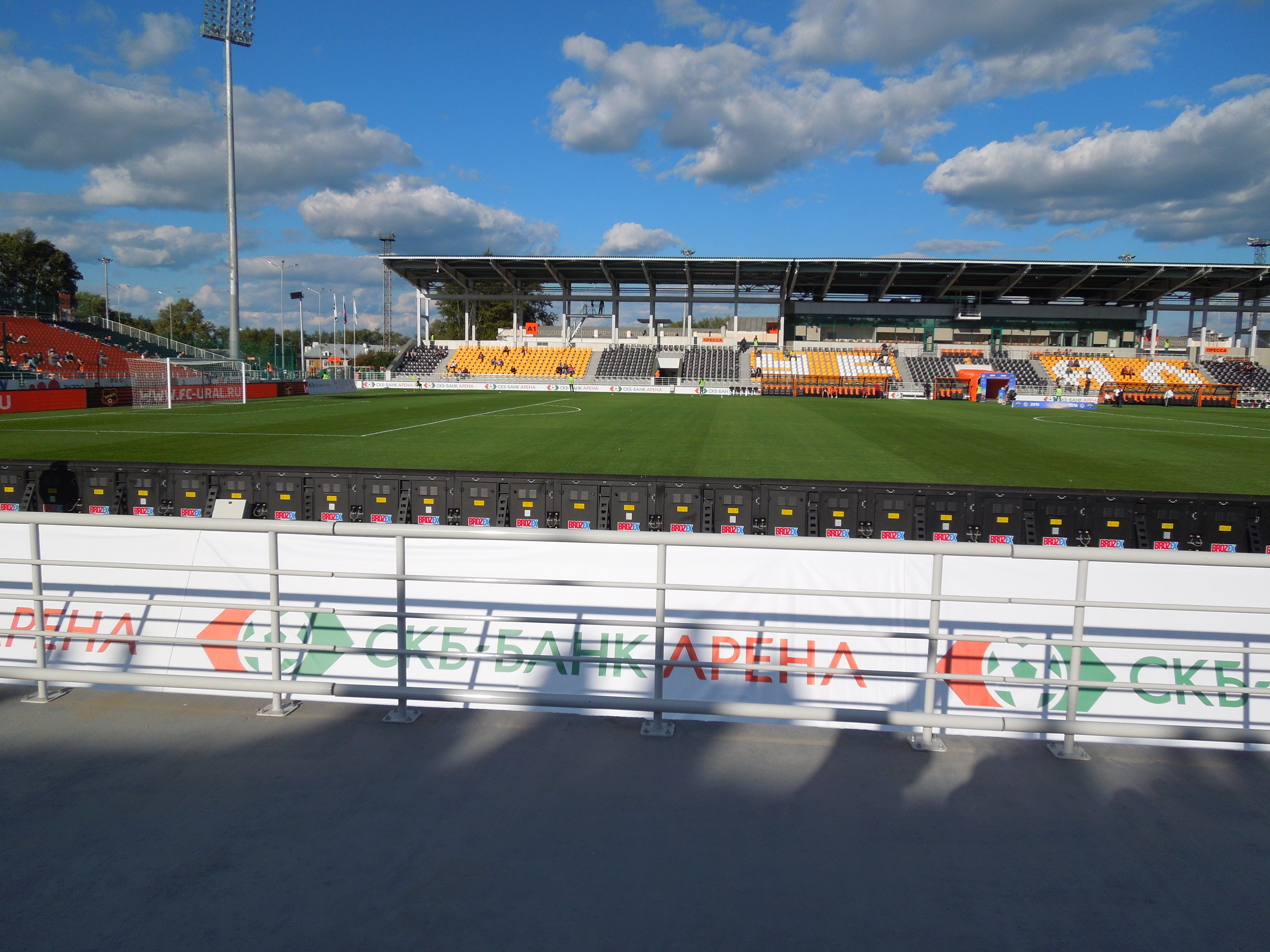
View of the covered Stand A (arena logo visible on the banner), 2015

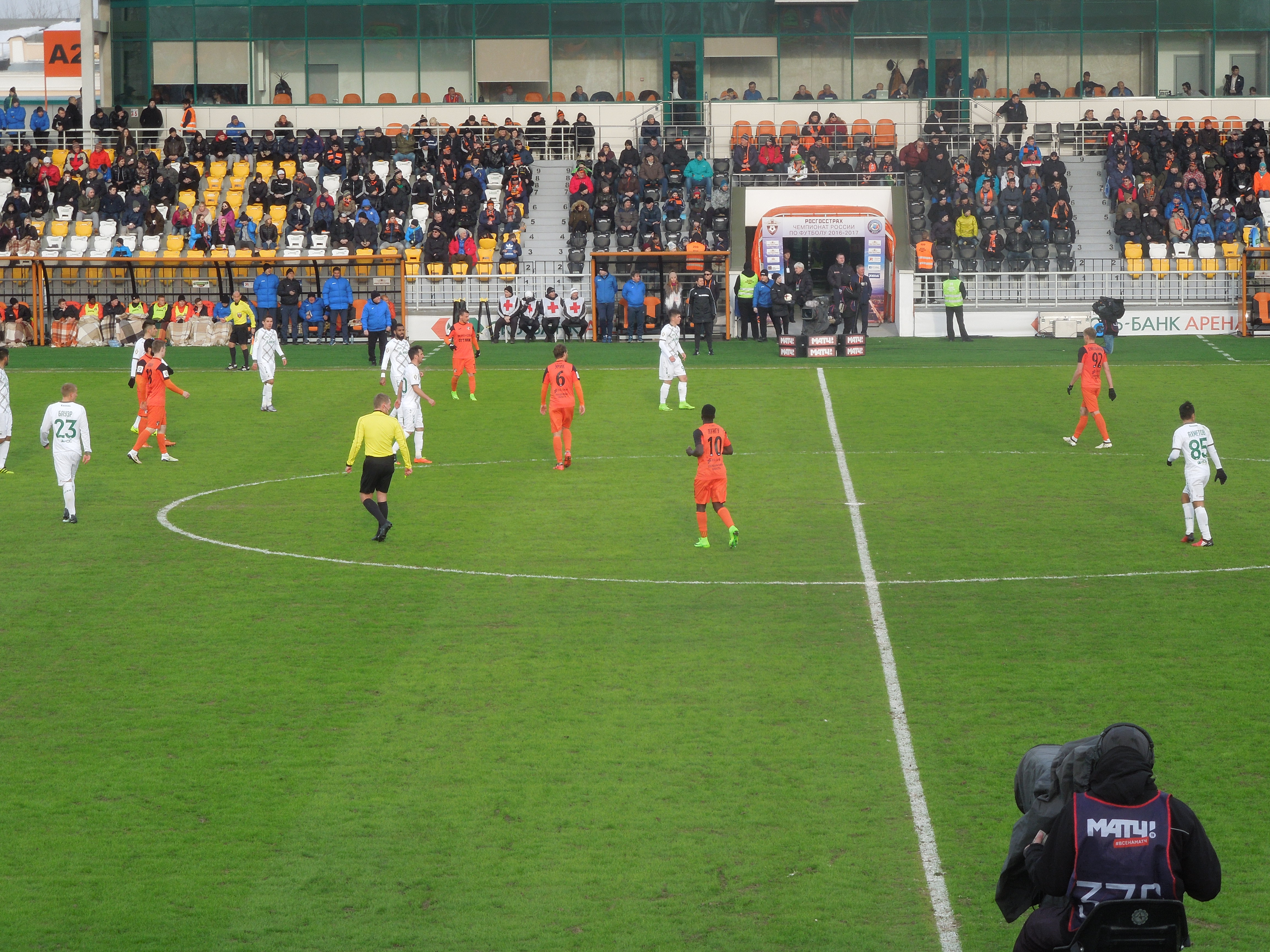
View of the covered Stand A (glass VIP box visible), 2017

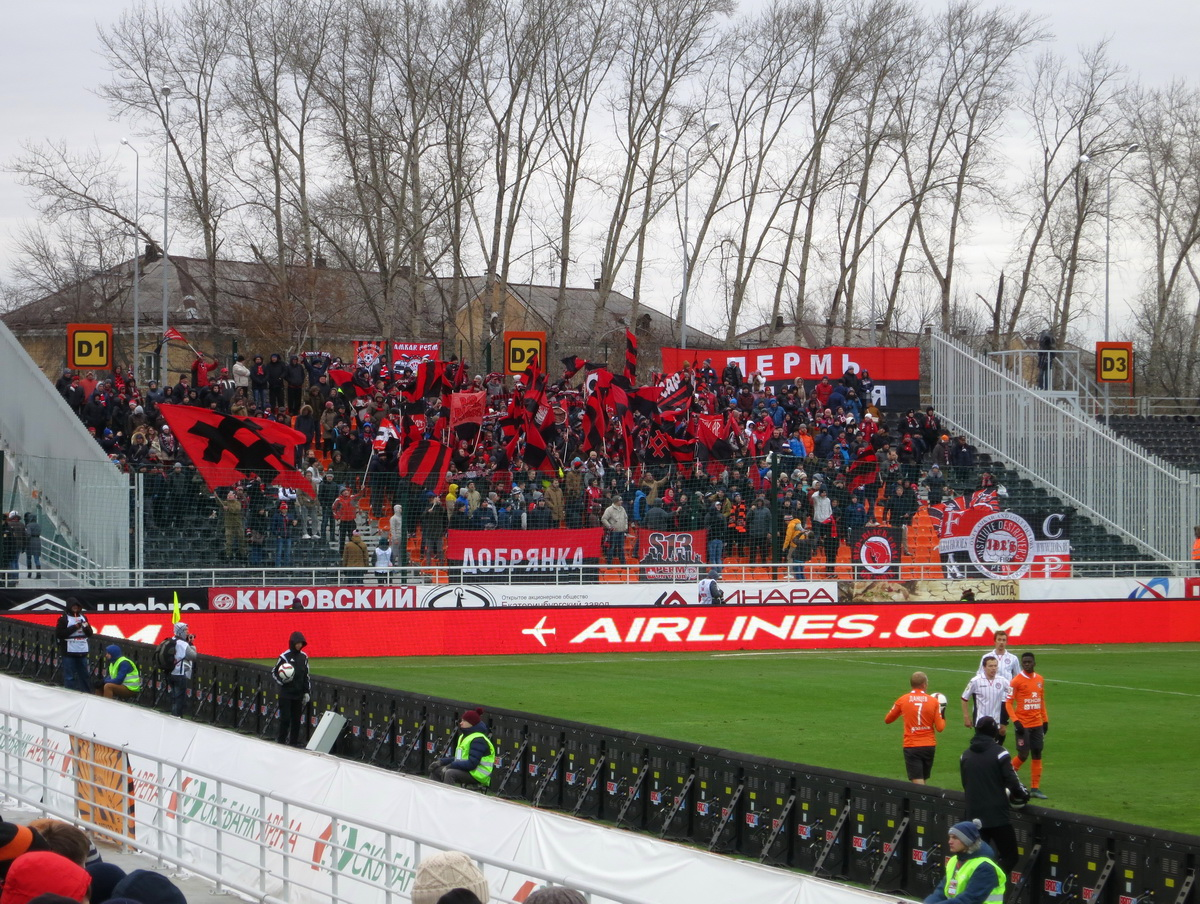
Guest sectors of Stand D during the match between Ural and Amkar, October 24, 2015

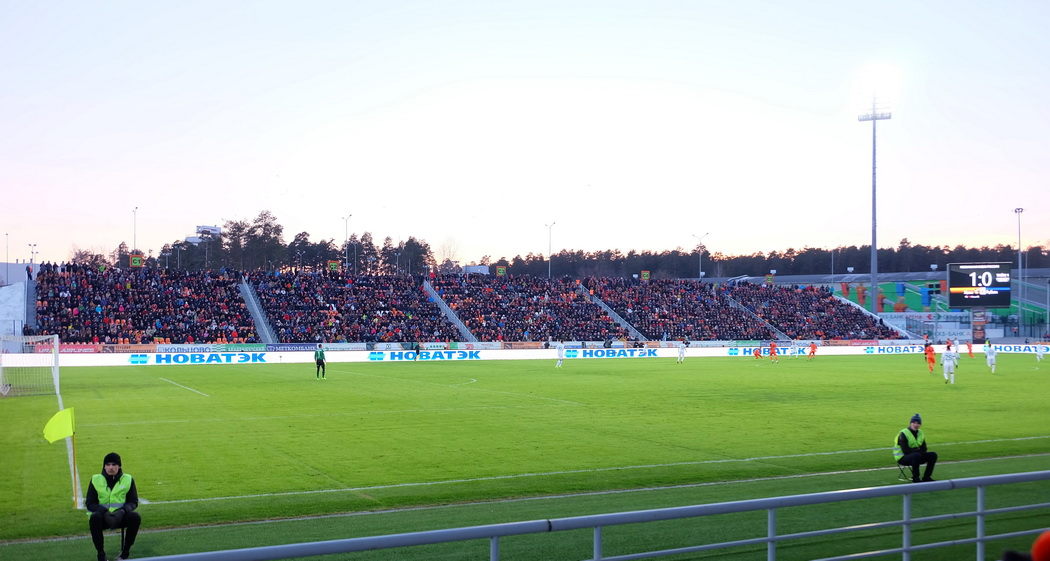
Stand C during the match between Ural and Rubin, April 6, 2017

== See also ==
- List of football stadiums in Russia
- List of association football stadiums by country
- List of European stadiums by capacity
- Lists of stadiums
