= 1994 state visits by Jiang Zemin to Russia, Ukraine, and France =

1994 diplomatic event

State visit by Jiang Zemin to Russia, Ukraine and France
- Date: September 2 to 12, 1994
- Venue: Moscow, Yekaterinburg, Kyiv and Paris
- Organised by: Government of Russia; Government of Ukraine; Government of France; Government of China

From 2 to 12 September 1994, Chinese President and General Secretary of the Chinese Communist Party Jiang Zemin paid a state visit to Russia, Ukraine and France.

The leaders of China and Russia signed a joint statement guiding the overall development of relations between the two countries, noting that the two countries have a new type of constructive partnership. China and Ukraine issued a joint statement on the principles of relations between the two countries, declaring that they regarded each other as friendly countries. China and France signed a number of economic and trade contracts and agreements of intent on cooperation.

== Backgrounds ==
From 15 to 19 May 1991, Jiang Zemin, then General Secretary of the Chinese Communist Party and Chairman of the Central Military Commission of the People's Republic of China, paid an official visit to the Soviet Union, issued the China-Soviet Joint Communiqué and the Ministers for Foreign Affairs of the two countries signed an agreement on the eastern section of the China-Soviet Union border. On December 27 of the same year, after the dissolution of the Soviet Union, China announced its official recognition of the government of the Russian Federation and confirmed the establishment of state relations with it. In 1992, at the invitation of Chinese President Yang Shangkun, President Boris Yeltsin of the Russian Federation paid an official visit to China. President Yang and President Yeltsin signed the Joint Declaration on the Basis of Mutual Relations between the People's Republic of China and the Russian Federation, which laid down the principled basis for the "development of relations between the two friendly countries".

Jiang's September 1994 trip was a return visit to President Yeltsin's visit to China in 1992 and the first visit to Russia by a Chinese head of state since the collapse of the Soviet Union. The high-level meeting between the two leaders was of great significance for the promotion of mutually beneficial relations of cooperation between China and Russia.

== Russia ==
During the visit, Jiang Zemin held talks with President Boris Yeltsin and signed the China-Russian Joint Declaration and the Joint Declaration of the President of the People's Republic of China and the President of the Russian Federation on Mutual No-First-Use of Nuclear Weapons and Mutual Non-Targeting of Strategic Nuclear Weapons against Each Other (Chinese: 《中俄关于互不首先使用核武器和互不将战略核武器瞄准对方的联合声明》). The two sides also signed the Agreement between the People's Republic of China and the Russian Federation on the Western Section of the Russian-Chinese Border, the Agreement between the Government of the People's Republic of China and the Government of the Russian Federation on Customs Cooperation and Mutual Assistance, the Protocol between the Government of the People's Republic of China and the Government of the Russian Federation on the Round Trip Sailing of Vessels from the Ussuri River (Ussuri) under the City of Khabarovsk to the Heilungjiang River (Amur River), the 1994 Protocol on Economic and Trade Cooperation between the Governments of China and the Russian Federation, and a series of other important documents.

On September 6, 1994, Jiang Zemin visited the Uralmash in Yekaterinburg, Russia. At noon, Jiang Zemin and his entourage left Yekaterinburg to Ukraine.

== Ukraine ==
The afternoon of September 6, at the invitation of President of Ukraine Leonid Kuchma, Jiang Zemin returned to visit Ukraine, the Prime Minister of Ukraine Vitaliy Masol and his wife to the airport to meet. Jiang's visit is the first visit of a Chinese head of state to Ukraine since the establishment of diplomatic relations between China and Ukraine.

Then Jiang accompanied by Prime Minister and Mrs. Masol to the Mariinskyi Palace. The two countries also signed the Joint Declaration of the People's Republic of China and Ukraine at the Marian Palace in Kyiv.

== France ==
On September 9, 1994, the President of France François Mitterrand went to Paris Orly Airport to greet the visiting Chinese leader Jiang Zemin. On the same day, President Mitterrand greeted Jiang Zemin in front of the Élysée Palace in Paris.

On September 12, Jiang delivered a speech in Paris on China's reform and opening-up and Sino-French relations, in which he put forward the principles of China's relations with Western Europe. China and France also signed 19 contractual agreements on economic and trade cooperation, totaling 18.1 billion francs.
