= Mashinostroiteley =

Yekaterinburg Metro station

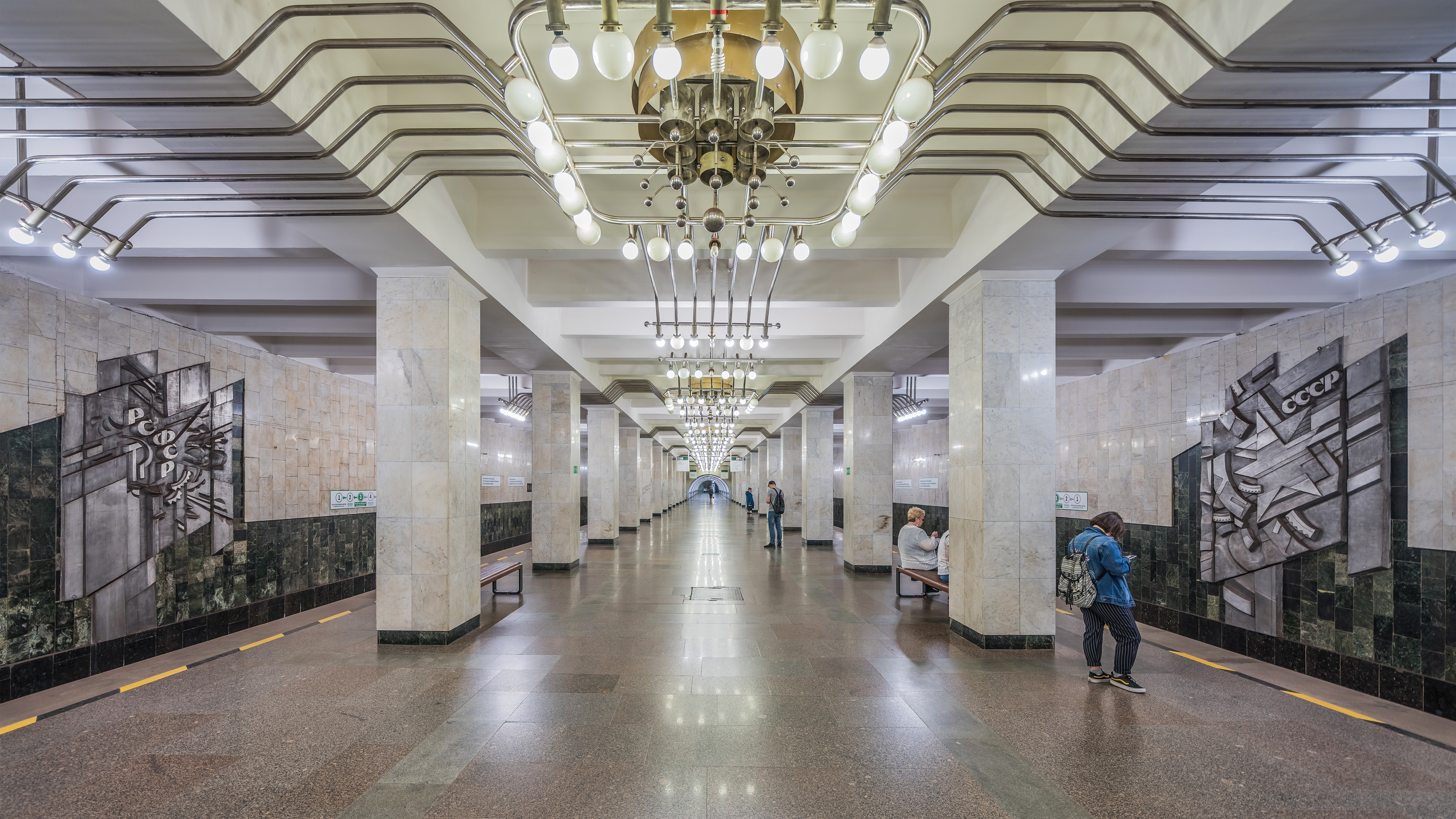

General information
- Coordinates: 56.877778°N 60.611667°E
- System: Yekaterinburg Metro
- Line: First line
- Platforms: 1
- Tracks: 2

Construction
- Structure type: island

History
- Opened: 27 April 1991

Services
Preceding station	Yekaterinburg Metro	Following station
Uralmash towards Prospekt Kosmonavtov	First Line	Uralskaya towards Botanicheskaya
Route map
Location

Mashinostroiteley (Russian: Машиностроителей) is a station of the Yekaterinburg Metro which was opened on 27 April 1991. It is situated between stations Uralmash (Yekaterinburg Metro) and Uralskaya.

== Construction History ==
January 1981 — movement of engineering and transport networks began in the area of the station, including the transfer of Yekaterinburg tram tracks at the intersection of Kosmonavtov Avenue and Mashinostroiteley street.
August 1982 — construction of tunnels began on the longest stretch of the launch site between Mashinostroiteley and Uralskaya stations.
July 1983 — excavation of a pit for the station was started by Trust Stroymekhanizatsiya No. 2.
April 1985 — the first linking of the metro line tunnels took place (the line to the Uralmash station).
April 1986 — on the eve of the anniversary of the 116th birthday of V. I. Lenin, the second tunnel on the stretch to the "Uralmash" station was connected.
February 1986 — architectural and finishing work unfolded.
August 1987 — from the pit of the station, the most difficult tunneling was carried out under the railway tracks in the direction of lobby No. 1 and Kalinin Machine-Building Plant.
February 1988 — the first cubic meters of concrete were poured on a permanent railway track in the line tunnel to the Uralmash station.
March 1988 — I. Torgachev's team of finishers from Soyuzmetrospetsstroy began cladding the columns of the station's underground platform with white marble from Koelga.
June 1988 — installation of the first escalator started at the station.
August 1988 — the laying of track concrete in the right-hand running tunnel between the stations "Uralmash" and "Mashinostroiteley" was completed.
June 1989 — work began on the installation of escalators in lobby No. 1 of the station.
June 1989 — STP at the station is complete.
April 25, 1991 — commissioned by the State Commission.
April 26, 1991 — first run- for the metro builders.
April 27, 1991 — open for passenger traffic.
December 22, 1992 — open for passenger traffic to «Uralskaya» station.

== Design ==
It is a column-type station with a flat horizontal ceiling, the platform hall is divided by 24 columns, with a distance of 4.5 meters between them. The base of the track walls is laid with slabs of black labradorite, in the center - a wide strip of green Shabrovsky serpentinite, the upper part is decorated with Koelga marble. The walls are decorated with artistic exhibits in the form of bas-reliefs cast from metal. The floors are polished granite with a clear geometric pattern. The light fixtures and furniture were made at ZiK. The project was developed by the institute Uralsky PromstroyNIIproekt (headed by N.A.Kudinova).

The station has two lobbies. The northern lobby leads to the intersection of Kosmonavtov Avenue and Frontovykh Brigad Street; the southern one - to Kosmonavtov Avenue in the direction of the M.I. Kalinin plant.

In the inclined tunnels of both vestibules, there are short escalators for the ascent (2 belts with two lamps on the balustrades between them) and ordinary stairs for the descent. The station has one more feature: the inclined tunnel of the southern lobby does not adjoin directly to the station hall, but is connected to it by a gallery.

== Ground Public Transportation ==
The station has exits to three stops: trolleybuses, trams and fixed-route taxis.

Tables: public transport routes (data as of May 2020)

Buses
No.	toward metro station	End Point 1	End Point 2
059	«Prospekt Kosmonavtov», «Mashinostroiteley»	"Dom" Hypermarket	40 let VLKSM
103	«Prospekt Kosmonavtov», «Uralmash», «Mashinostroiteley»	Peduniversitet (pedagogical university)	Kedrovoye (settlement)
108	«Prospekt Kosmonavtov», «Uralmash», «Mashinostroiteley»	Peduniversitet	Verkhnyaya Pyshma (town)
111	«Prospekt Kosmonavtov», «Uralmash», «Mashinostroiteley»	Peduniversitet	Sredneuralsk (town)
134	«Prospekt Kosmonavtov», «Uralmash», «Mashinostroiteley»	Peduniversitet	Ol'khovka (village)
161	«Prospekt Kosmonavtov», «Uralmash», «Mashinostroiteley»	Peduniversitet	Sanatornyy (village)
223	«Prospekt Kosmonavtov», «Uralmash», «Mashinostroiteley»	Peduniversitet	"Ganina Yama" Monastery

Trams
No.	toward Metro Station	End Point 1	End Point 2
2	«Prospekt Kosmonavtov (Yekaterinburg Metro)», «Mashinostroiteley» («Peduniversitet» stop), «Ploshchad 1905 Goda»	Frezerovshchikov street	VIZ (Vizovsky residential area)
5	«Uralmash (Yekaterinburg Metro)», «Mashinostroiteley» («Peduniversitet» stop), «Uralskaya» («Zh.D. Vokzal» stop), «Geologicheskaya» («Tsirk» stop), «Chkalovskaya» («Avtovokzal» stop), «Botanicheskaya»	UZTM (Uralmash factory)	Metro Station «Botanicheskaya»
5А	«Uralmash (Yekaterinburg Metro)», «Mashinostroiteley» («Peduniversitet» stop)	UZTM (Uralmash factory)	Shartash
7	«Mashinostroiteley» («Peduniversitet» stop), «Uralskaya» («Zh.D. Vokzal» stop)	Elmash	7 Klyuchey microdistrict
8	«Uralmash (Yekaterinburg Metro)», «Mashinostroiteley» («Peduniversitet» stop),	Mashinostroiteley Street	40 let VLKSM Street
14	«Mashinostroiteley» («Peduniversitet» stop), «Geologicheskaya» («Tsirk» stop), «Chkalovskaya» («Avtovokzal» stop)	Elmash	Keramicheskaya
16	«Mashinostroiteley» («Peduniversitet» stop)(«Avtovokzal» stop)	Elmash	Shartash
17	«Uralmash (Yekaterinburg Metro)», «Mashinostroiteley» («Peduniversitet» stop),	Mashinostroiteley Street	Elmash
22	«Uralmash (Yekaterinburg Metro)» ("Kuznetsova street" stop), «Mashinostroiteley»	Mashinostroiteley Street	Ural Federal University
25	«Prospekt Kosmonavtov (Yekaterinburg Metro)», «Mashinostroiteley» («Peduniversitet» stop), «Geologicheskaya» («Tsirk» stop), «Chkalovskaya» («Avtovokzal» stop)	Frezerovshchikov street	Keramicheskaya

Trolleybuses
No.	toward Metro Station	End Point 1	End Point 2
3	«Prospekt Kosmonavtov (Yekaterinburg Metro)», «Uralmash (Yekaterinburg Metro)», «Mashinostroiteley» («Peduniversitet» stop), «Uralskaya» (Zh.D. Vokzal), «Ploshchad 1905 Goda» («Ploshchad Malsheva» and «Rubin» stops),	Kommunisticheskaya street	Posadskaya street
5	«Prospekt Kosmonavtov (Yekaterinburg Metro)», «Uralmash (Yekaterinburg Metro)», «Mashinostroiteley» (Peduniversitet» stop), «Uralskaya» (Zh.D. Vokzal)	Kommunisticheskaya street	Mayakovsky Central Park of Culture and Leisure
12	«Prospekt Kosmonavtov (Yekaterinburg Metro)», «Uralmash (Yekaterinburg Metro)», «Mashinostroiteley» (Peduniversitet» stop)	Kommunisticheskaya street	Akademicheskaya
16	«Mashinostroiteley» (Peduniversitet» stop)	Peduniversitet	Taganskaya street
17	«Uralmash (Yekaterinburg Metro)», «Mashinostroiteley» (Peduniversitet» stop), «Uralskaya» (Zh.D. Vokzal), «Ploshchad 1905 Goda» («Ploshchad Malsheva» and «Rubin» stops)	UZTM (Uralmash factory)	Kraulya street
