= OMZ (disambiguation) =

OMZ refers to Objedinennye Mashinostroitelnye Zavody (English: Uralmash-Izhora Group), a Russian manufacturing conglomerate.

OMZ may also refer to:

- Oxygen minimum zone, the zone in which oxygen saturation in ocean seawater is at its lowest
- Ossa Morena Zone, a geological area of the Iberian Peninsula
