= Izhorskiye Zavody =

Russian manufacturing company

Izhorskye Zavody
- Type: Public Joint Stock Company
- Industry: Machinery
- Founded: 1722
- Headquarters: Kolpino, Saint Petersburg, Russia
- Revenue: $143 million (2014)
- Parent: OMZ
- Website: omz-izhora.ru

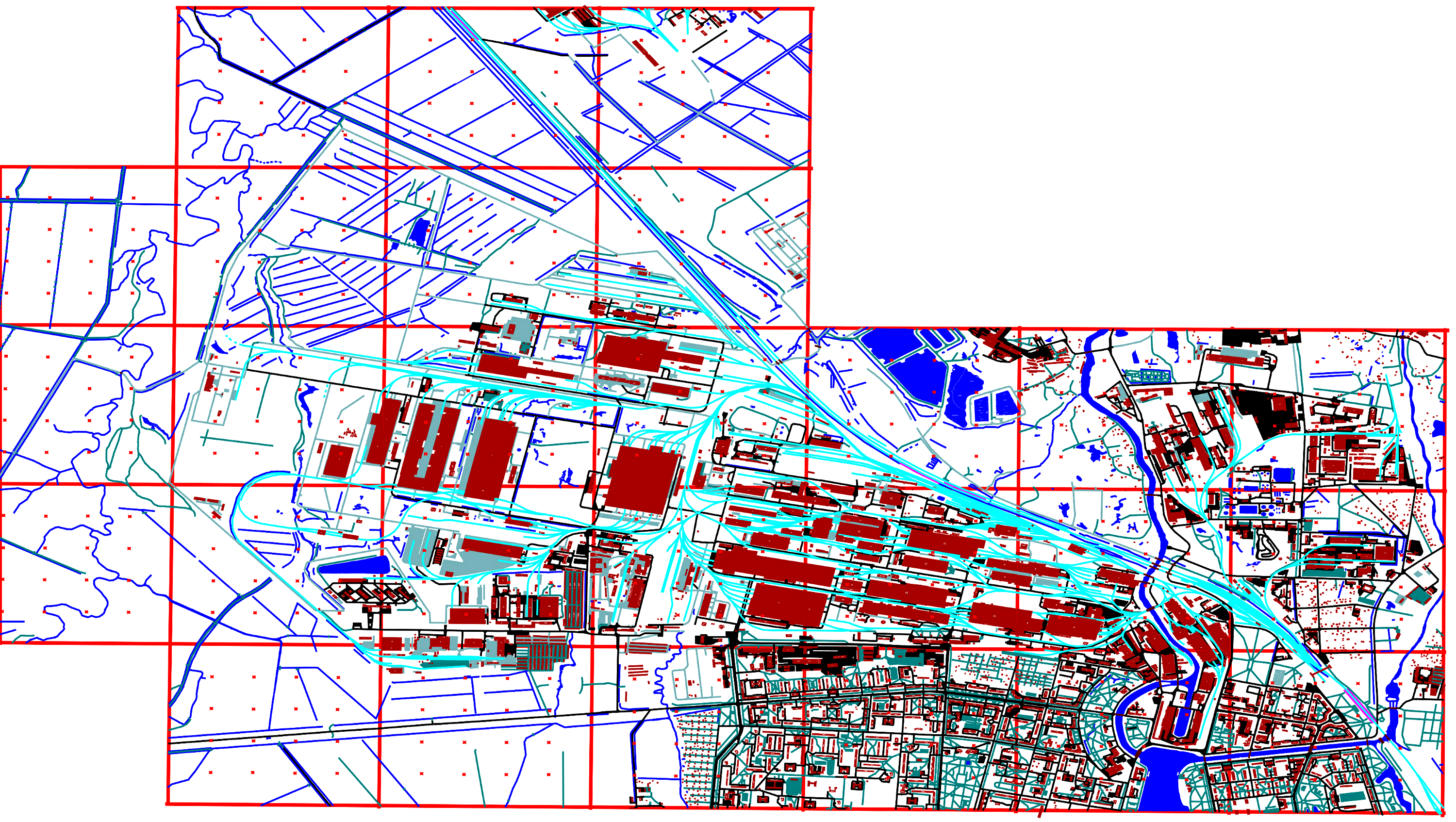
Map of Izhorskye Zavody

Izhorskiye Zavody or Izhora Plants (Russian: Ижо́рские заво́ды) is a Russian machine building joint stock company (OAO) belonging to the OMZ Group. It operates a major manufacturing plant in Kolpino, Saint Petersburg.

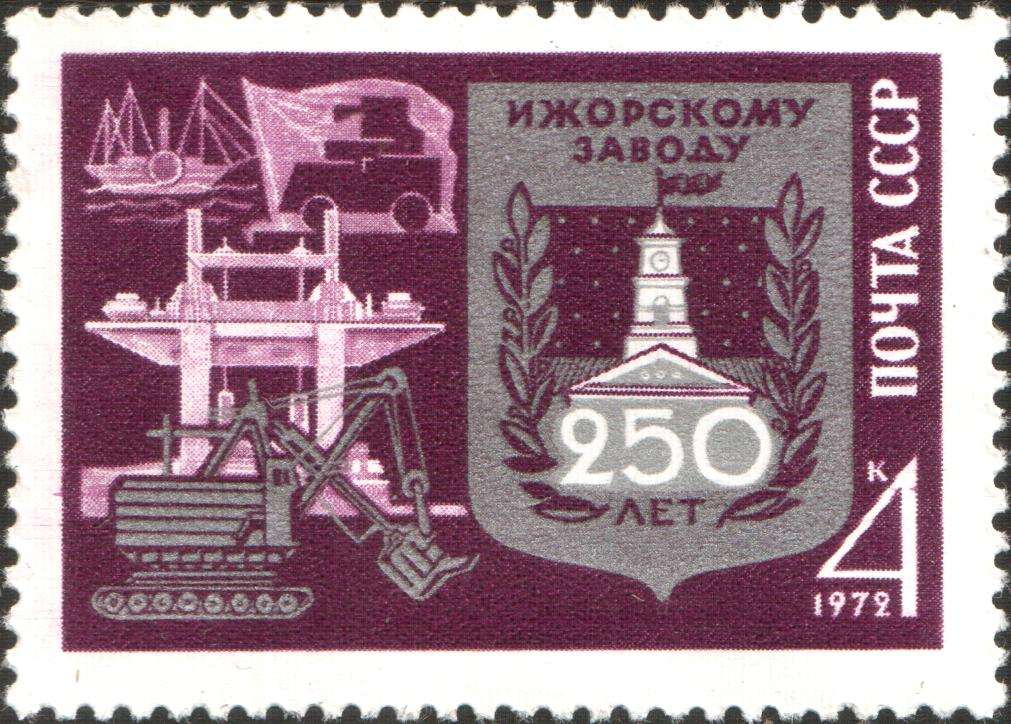
250 years anniversary of Izhorskiye Zavody. Post of USSR, 1972.

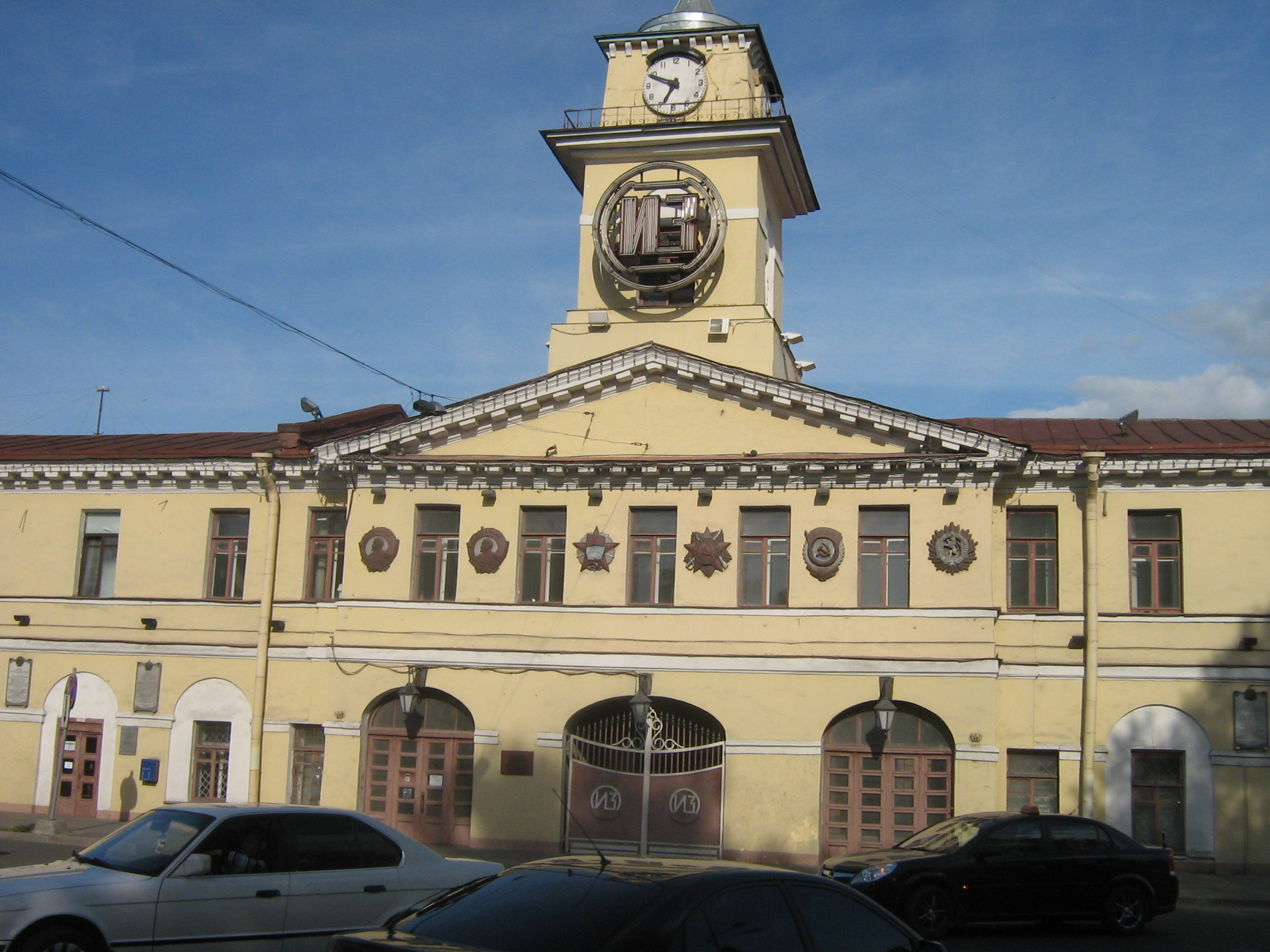
Office building of Izhorskye Zavody

== Operations ==
The company is primarily a heavy industry factory. It specializes in engineering, production, sales and maintenance of equipment and machines for the nuclear power, oil and gas, and mining industries, and in production of special steels and equipment for other industries. Production includes metal tanks, boilers, pressure vessels of nuclear reactors, and devices for distillation, filtering or purification of liquids and gases. It has produced the reactor vessels for the first Russian floating nuclear power station Akademik Lomonosov.

In November 2021 Izhorskiye Zavody manufactured and delivered at sea a reaction vessel for Akkuyu Nuclear Power Plant Unit 2 in Turkey. The price of the reaction vessel is approximately RUB 3 billion, based on a contract signed in 2017.
