= Prospekt Kosmonavtov =

Yekaterinburg Metro station

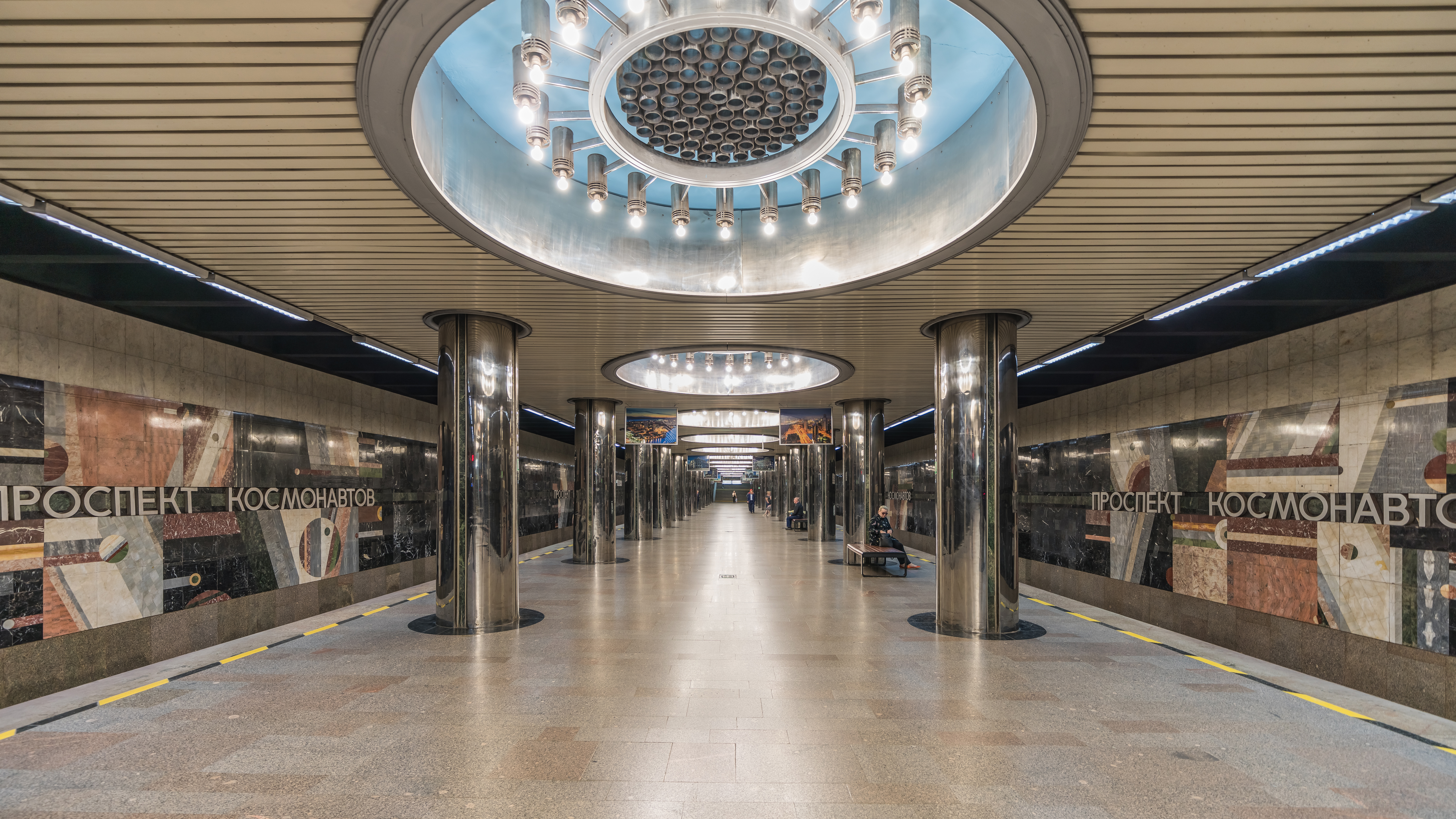

General information
- Coordinates: 56.901667°N 60.614444°E
- System: Yekaterinburg Metro
- Line: First line
- Platforms: 1
- Tracks: 2

Construction
- Structure type: island

History
- Opened: 1991-04-27

Services
Preceding station	Yekaterinburg Metro	Following station
Terminus	First Line	Uralmash towards Botanicheskaya
Route map
Location

Prospekt Kosmonavtov (Russian: Проспект Космонавтов) is a station of the Yekaterinburg Metro. It is the last station of the first line, situated between the depo(Kalinovskoe) and the station Uralmash. The station was opened on 27 April 1991 as part of the first section of the Yekaterinburg metro: "Prospekt Kosmonavtov" – Mashinostroiteley. The station is located at the intersection of Starykh Bolshevikov and Ilyich streets with Kosmonavtov Avenue.

== Construction history ==
- May 1982 – after preliminary dewatering, the open pit mining of a pit over 500 meters long began.
- September 1982 – a gantry crane was installed, a shower facility for workers was also built.
- October 1983 – the construction of the first station lobby was assembled, and in November, the installation of lobby No. 2 was completed.
- September 1984 – the tunneling shield KM-34 was assembled in the left running tunnel connecting the neighboring stations Prospekt Kosmonavtov and Uralmash.
- June 1986 – architectural and finishing work began.
- 23 February 1987 – a link was made in the left tunnel on the stretch to Uralmash station, and in July 1989 – a link was made in the right tunnel on the stretch to Uralmash station.
- January 1989 – architectural and finishing work began at the pedestrian crossing No. 3.
- 25 April 1991 – the station was accepted into operation by the state commission.
- 26 April 1991 – the first ride went to the metro builders.
- 27 April 1991 – the metro was open for passenger traffic.
- August 1998 – two new ground-level lobbies were opened on the other (eastern) side of Kosmonavtov Avenue.

== Design ==
The interior of the metro station was designed by a team of architects led by Spartak Ziganshin. The design of the station was based on the idea of USSR leadership in space exploration.

The station is richly decorated with marble. The platform is supported by mirrored chrome columns designed by Vyacheslav Butusov – at that time a graduate of Sverdlovsk Architectural Institute – to look like rockets.

The track walls are trimmed with Ukrainian labradorite and black marble with white veins of quartzite, reminiscent of the starry night sky. The lighting is made to resemble spacecraft nozzles. All metal elements were manufactured by the plant – Uralelectrotyazhmash. The composition of mosaics and reliefs was created by artist Boris Klochkov.

== Lobbies and transfers ==
The station has two underground lobbies, neither exit has escalators. The northern lobby is located in a densely populated area on Kosmonavtov Avenue. The southern vestibule is connected to the underground passage at the intersection of Fraserovshchikov Street / Ilyich Street and Kosmonavtov Avenue (Cosmonauts Avenue).

== Technical Characteristics ==
- Station Construction – three-span shallow column station.
- Depth of the foundation – 6 meters.

== Travel Development ==
There are two dead ends behind the station and a crossover between them.

== Ground Public transportation ==
The station has exits to six stops (including the end ones) of all types of ground transport: buses, trolleybuses, trams and fixed-route taxis.

Tables: public transport routes (data as of May 2020)

Buses
No.	toward Metro Station	End Point 1	End Point 2
56	«Prospekt Kosmonavtov», «Uralmash (Yekaterinburg Metro)»	UZTM (Uralmash factory)	Dom culturi (Sadovy) (House of Culture)
56B	«Prospekt Kosmonavtov», «Uralmash (Yekaterinburg Metro)»	UZTM (Uralmash factory)	Berezit
59	«Prospekt Kosmonavtov», «Uralmash (Yekaterinburg Metro)»	UZTM (Uralmash factory)	Okruzhnoye kladbische (cemetery)
059	«Prospekt Kosmonavtov», «Mashinostroiteley»	«Dom» Hypermarket	40 let VLKSM
103	«Prospekt Kosmonavtov», «Uralmash (Yekaterinburg Metro)», «Mashinostroiteley»	Peduniversitet (pedagogical university)	Kedrovoye (settlement)
104е	«Prospekt Kosmonavtov», «Uralmash (Yekaterinburg Metro)»	UZTM (Uralmash factory)	Krasny-2
108	«Prospekt Kosmonavtov», «Uralmash (Yekaterinburg Metro)», «Mashinostroiteley»	Peduniversitet	Verkhnyaya Pyshma (town)
111	«Prospekt Kosmonavtov», «Uralmash (Yekaterinburg Metro)», «Mashinostroiteley»	Peduniversitet	Sredneuralsk (town)
134	«Prospekt Kosmonavtov», «Uralmash (Yekaterinburg Metro)», «Mashinostroiteley»	Peduniversitet	Ol'khovka (village)
142	«Prospekt Kosmonavtov», «Uralmash (Yekaterinburg Metro)»	UZTM (Uralmash factory)	Zeleny Bor
159	«Prospekt Kosmonavtov», «Uralmash (Yekaterinburg Metro)»	UZTM (Uralmash factory)	"Krasnogvardeysky" Zh.D. Stantsiya (Railway Station)
161	«Prospekt Kosmonavtov», «Uralmash (Yekaterinburg Metro)», «Mashinostroiteley»	Педуниверситет	Санаторный
223	«Prospekt Kosmonavtov», «Uralmash (Yekaterinburg Metro)», «Mashinostroiteley»	Peduniversitet	"Ganina Yama" Monastery

Trams
No.	toward Metro Station	End Point 1	End Point 2
2	«Prospekt Kosmonavtov», «Mashinostroiteley» («Peduniversitet» stop), «Ploshchad 1905 Goda»	Frezerovshchikov street	VIZ (Vizovsky residential area)
25	«Prospekt Kosmonavtov», «Mashinostroiteley» («Peduniversitet» stop), «Geologicheskaya» («Tsirk» stop), Chkalovskaya («Avtovokzal» stop)	Frezerovshchikov street	Keramicheskaya

Trolleybuses
No.	toward Metro Station	End Point 1	End Point 2
3	«Prospekt Kosmonavtov», «Uralmash (Yekaterinburg Metro)», «Mashinostroiteley» («Peduniversitet» stop), «Uralskaya» («Zh.D. Vokzal» stop), «Ploshchad 1905 Goda» ("Ploshchad Malysheva" and "Rubin" stops),	Kommunisticheskaya street	Posadskaya street
5	«Prospekt Kosmonavtov», «Uralmash (Yekaterinburg Metro)», «Mashinostroiteley» («Peduniversitet» stop), «Uralskaya» («Zh.D. Vokzal» stop)	Kommunisticheskaya street	Mayakovsky Central Park of Culture and Leisure.
10	«Prospekt Kosmonavtov»	Ilyich street	–
12	«Prospekt Kosmonavtov», «Uralmash (Yekaterinburg Metro)», «Mashinostroiteley» («Peduniversitet» stop)	Kommunisticheskaya street	Akademicheskaya
13	«Prospekt Kosmonavtov»	Kommunisticheskaya street	Taganskaya street
