= Uralmash (Yekaterinburg Metro) =

Yekaterinburg metro station

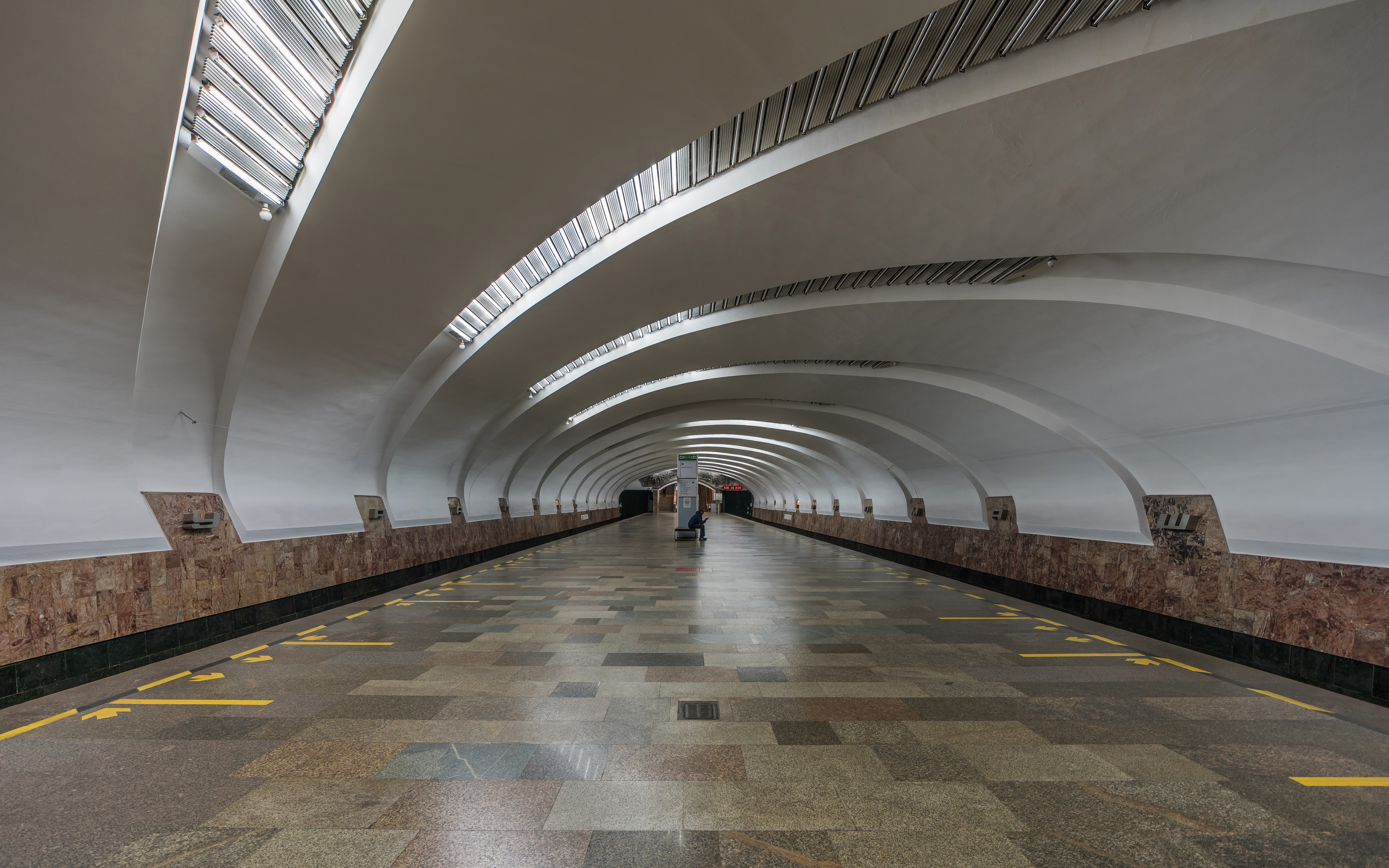

General information
- Coordinates: 56.887778°N 60.613611°E
- System: Yekaterinburg Metro
- Line: First line
- Platforms: 1
- Tracks: 2

Construction
- Structure type: island

History
- Opened: 27 April 1991

Services
Preceding station	Yekaterinburg Metro	Following station
Prospekt Kosmonavtov Terminus	First Line	Mashinostroiteley towards Botanicheskaya
Route map
Location

Uralmash (Russian: Уралмаш) is a station of the Yekaterinburg Metro located on the 1st line between the stations Prospekt Kosmonavtov (Yekaterinburg Metro) and Mashinostroiteley. It opened on April 27, 1991, as part of the first launch section of the Yekaterinburg metro "Prospekt Kosmonavtov." It got its name from the nearby Uralmash plant.

The station is located at the intersection of Baumana/Mashinostroiteley streets and Kosmonavtov Avenue.

== Construction History ==
- January 1981 — the movement of engineering and transport networks began in the area of the station.
- February 1983 — the Stroymekhanizatsiya trust No. 2 began the development of a pit for the station, over 300 meters long, and about 20 meters wide.
- September 1984 — in the left running tunnel connecting the neighboring stations "Prospekt Kosmonavtov" and "Uralmash", a tunneling shield KM-34 was assembled, by the end of December the first 50 meters were covered.
- April 1985 — in the foundation pit of the Uralmash station, the first linking of the metro line tunnels took place (the run to the Mashinostroiteley station).
- April 1986 — on the eve of the 116th birthday anniversary of V. I. Lenin - goundbreaking began for the second tunnel on the stretch to the station "Mashinostroiteley.
- October 1986 — the assembly of the structures for the No. 2 lobby is completed.
- June 10, 1987 — the construction of the 18-meter monolithic vault of the station began.
- February 23, 1987 — connection in the left tunnel on the stretch to the station "Prospect Kosmonavtov".
- February 1988 — the first cubic meters of concrete were laid in the running tunnel to the Mashinostroiteley station on a permanent railway track.
- March 1988 — finishing work began using marble from the Nizhniy Tagil deposit.
- August 1988 — the paving of track concrete was completed in the right running tunnel between the stations "Uralmash" and "Mashinostroiteley".
- September 1988 — at the Uralmash station, concreting of the platform section vault was completed.
- October 1988 — installation of STP at the station started.
- June 1989 — work has begun on the installation of escalators in the No. 1 lobby of the station.
- July 1989 — connection in the right tunnel on the stretch to the station "Prospect Kosmonavtov".
- April 25, 1991 — Commissioned by the State Commission.
- April 26, 1991 — first run - for metro builders.
- April 27, 1991 — open for passengers.
- January 1997 — a new ground lobby was opened in residential building No. 1 on Baumana Street.
- October 19, 2001 — the 4th underground passage under Mashinostroiteley Street and a new ground lobby on the south side of the street were opened.

== Design ==
The monolithic vault of the station is cut with parallel edges along diagonal channels. As conceived by the authors, the ceiling should resemble the thread of a screw, or the shape of giant machines and give the station an industrial flavor. The design used cast iron: patterned metal plates, small parts and original fittings. The color scheme of the interior is calm, restrained, without much richness and variety of natural stone. The side walls are made of gray and gray-white Nizhny Tagil marble, the floor on the platform is paved with granite slabs. The bas-reliefs on the end walls, dedicated to the workers of Uralmash, were created by the sculptor Vladimir Yegorovich Egorov and the letters in the word "Uralmash" were done by Vyacheslav Butusov.

== Technical Characteristics ==
- Station construction: single-vaulted shallow station.
- Foundation depth: 6–8 meters.

== Lobbies and Transfers ==
The station has two underground lobbies. The southern lobby is located at the northwest corner of the intersection of Kosmonavtov Avenue and Mashinostroiteley Street, but, in addition, it is connected by a long underground passage with the southwest corner of the same intersection and with the eastern side of Kosmonavtov Avenue. In 2001, this intersection was significantly reconstructed, now tram and trolleybus stops have been moved directly to the metro pavilions. The eastern exit of the underground passage is built into a residential building, which is the only such case in the city. In the inclined tunnels of the southern vestibule, there are short escalators for the ascent (2 belts with two lamps on the balustrade between them) and the usual stairs for the descent. The northern lobby is located next to residential buildings on Kosmonavtov Avenue, not far from the Lavrov Palace of Culture. This lobby, unlike the southern one, has no escalators: there is only a staircase.

== Ground Public Transportation ==
The station has exits to four stops of all types of ground transport: buses, trolley buses, trams and minibus routes.

Table: public transport routes (data as of May 2020)

Buses
No.	toward metro station	End Point 1	End Point 2
36	«Uralmash»	Pekhotintsev street	Ural Federal University
56	«Prospekt Kosmonavtov», «Uralmash»	UZTM (Uralmash factory)	Dom Kul'tury (House of Culture)
59	«Prospekt Kosmonavtov», «Uralmash»	UZTM (Uralmash factory)	Okruzhnoye kladbishche (District cemetery)
103	«Prospekt Kosmonavtov», «Uralmash (Yekaterinburg Metro)», «Mashinostroiteley»	Peduniversitet	Kedrovoye
104е	«Prospekt Kosmonavtov», «Uralmash (Yekaterinburg Metro)»	UZTM (Uralmash factory)	Krasnyy-2
108	«Prospekt Kosmonavtov», «Uralmash (Yekaterinburg Metro)», «Mashinostroiteley»	Peduniversitet	Verkhnyaya Pyshma
111	«Prospekt Kosmonavtov», «Uralmash (Yekaterinburg Metro)», «Mashinostroiteley»	Peduniversitet	Sredneuralsk
134	«Prospekt Kosmonavtov», «Uralmash (Yekaterinburg Metro)», «Mashinostroiteley»	Peduniversitet	Olkhovka
142	«Prospekt Kosmonavtov», «Uralmash (Yekaterinburg Metro)»	UZTM (Uralmash factory)	Zelenyy Bor
159	«Prospekt Kosmonavtov», «Uralmash (Yekaterinburg Metro)»	UZTM (Uralmash factory)	Zh.D. (Railroad) Station «Krasnogvardeysky»
161	«Prospekt Kosmonavtov», «Uralmash (Yekaterinburg Metro)», «Mashinostroiteley»	Peduniversitet	Sanatornyy
223	«Prospekt Kosmonavtov», «Uralmash (Yekaterinburg Metro)», «Mashinostroiteley»	Peduniversitet	Monastery at Ganina Yama

Trams
No.	toward next station	End Point 1	End Point 2
5	«Uralmash», «Mashinostroiteley» («Peduniversitet» stop), «Uralskaya» («Zh.D. Vokzal» stop)	UZTM (Uralmash factory)	40 Let Vlksm
5А	«Uralmash», «Mashinostroiteley» («Peduniversitet» stop)	UZTM (Uralmash factory)	Shartash
8	«Uralmash», «Mashinostroiteley» («Peduniversitet» stop),	Mashinostroiteley street	40 Let Vlksm street
17	«Uralmash», «Mashinostroiteley» («Peduniversitet» stop),	Mashinostroiteley street	Elmash
22	«Uralmash» («Kuznetsova street» stop), «Mashinostroiteley»	Mashinostroiteley street	Mashinostroiteley street (circle)
24	«Uralmash» («Kuznetsova street» stop)	UZTM (Uralmash factory)	7 Klyuchey Microdistrict

Trolleybuses
No.	toward next station	End Point 1	End Point 2
3	«Prospekt Kosmonavtov», «Uralmash», «Mashinostroiteley» («Peduniversitet» stop), «Uralskaya» («Zh.D. Vokzal» stop), «Ploshchad 1905 Goda» ("Ploshchad Malysheva" and "Rubin" stops)	Kommunisticheskaya street	Tokarey street
5	«Prospekt Kosmonavtov», «Uralmash», «Mashinostroiteley» («Peduniversitet» stop), «Uralskaya» («Zh.D. Vokzal» stop)	Kommunisticheskaya street	Mayakovsky Central Park of Culture and Leisure.
12	«Prospekt Kosmonavtov», «Uralmash», «Mashinostroiteley» («Peduniversitet» stop)	Kommunisticheskaya street	Akademicheskaya
17	«Uralmash», «Mashinostroiteley» («Peduniversitet» stop), «Uralskaya» («Zh.D. Vokzal» stop)	UZTM (Uralmash factory)	UZTM (Uralmash factory) (circle)
