= United Heavy Machinery =

- Native name: Объединенные машиностроительные заводы
- Company type: Open Joint Stock Company
- Traded as: MCX: OMZZP
- Industry: Engineering
- Headquarters: Moscow
- Revenue: $56 million (2016)
- Operating income: −$5.8 million (2016)
- Net income: −$34.2 million (2016)
- Total assets: $1.08 billion (2016)
- Total equity: $281 million (2016)
- Owner: Gazprombank Asset Management (98.6%)
- Website: www.omz.ru

United Heavy Machinery or Uralmash-Izhora Group, (Russian: Объединенные машиностроительные заводы, romanized: Objedinennye Mashinostroitelnye Zavody, OMZ) is a large Russia-based international heavy industry and manufacturing conglomerate. OMZ manufactures a wide range of steel, custom and industrial components for nuclear power plants, petrochemical and mining operations and utilities. In particular OMZ is a manufacturer of reactor pressure vessels for the VVER type of nuclear reactors and the manufacturer of EKG open-cut mining power shovels.

As a Russian open joint-stock company, shares in OMZ may be publicly traded subject to terms of constitutive documents and merger agreements.

== History ==
OMZ was formed in 1996 in the incorporation of Ural Machine-Building Plants with ZSMK. Izhora Plants merged with OMZ in 1999 and the company was renamed OMZ (Uralmash-Izhora Group). In 2003 the company combined with Pilsen Steel and Škoda JS, the former steel and nuclear subsidiaries of Škoda Works. In 2008 CHETENG Engineering also joined. OMZ is a 50% owner of the Uralmash Machine-Building Corporation formed in a 2007 agreement with Metalloinvest.

The company's shares were delisted from the Moscow and London stock exchanges in 2014 "due to the economic inexpedience of supporting the insignificant free-float of less than 0.33% of the capital."

== Operation ==
PJSC EMZ is engaged in industrial technology development, invests in technological assets with growth potential in strategic industries.

Financial indicators

The company's revenue under IFRS in 2023 amounted to 26,007,318 thousand rubles, net profit was received in the amount of 3,462,836 thousand rubles.

== Management ==
The company is controlled by Gazprombank. The general director of the company is Roman Sergeevich Kuvshinov.

== See also ==
- Uralmash
- Izhorsky Zavod
- Kakha Bendukidze
- Gazprombank
