= Uralmash gang =

Crime syndicate

- Founded: 1989/1990
- Territory: Yekaterinburg
- Membership: c.60
- Activities: Theft, fraud, extortion, contract killings

The Uralmash gang (Russian: Уралмашевская группировка) was a Russian mafia crime syndicate based in the city of Yekaterinburg.

== History ==
Founded in the late 1980s by a group of former athletes led by the Tsyganov brothers, the group consolidated control over several businesses in the city during the transition to a free market economy, including the famous Uralmash factory (from which the group got its name). The profits earned from racketeering went on to be reinvested in a number of legitimate businesses, expanding the group's reach.

During the 1990s, the Uralmash group was involved in a number of gang wars. One was an internal conflict, between the more traditional criminals who obeyed the Thieves Code and the sportsmen, who dominated the organization and eventually came out on top. Another was a violent clash with the Central gang, their main rivals in the city. The number of fatalities was so great that the two gangs had their own cemeteries. Gravestones were often extremely elaborately designed and bore images of the buried, dressed in classical 1990s gangster fashion (tracksuit, leather jacket, etc.). Sometimes gangster's nicknames and/or their particular skills would also be etched on the gravestone (for example, expert in judo).

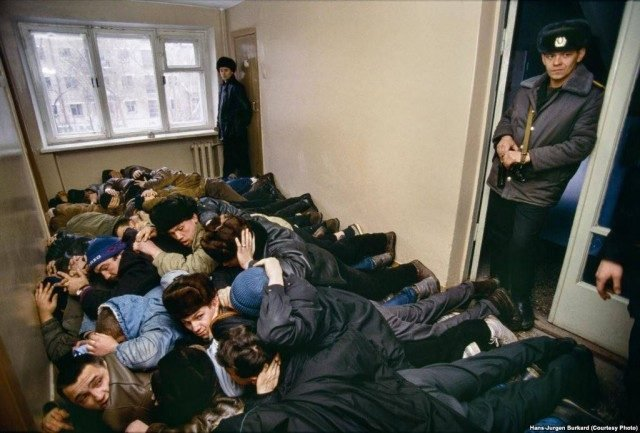
Detained bandits from the Uralmash group lie on the ground before interrogation

During the 1990s, the Uralmash was also involved in a vigilante group, City Without Drugs, which targeted both drug dealers and users in an attempt to rid the city of the heroin trade. Dealers were beaten and brutalised, often publicly to send a message to others, while addicts were chained to radiators and forced to go cold turkey. This action may have been a part of a public relations campaign to legitimise the group. The Uralmash also organised fashion shows to raise money for the city's children.

By the end of the decade, Uralmash's leaders legitimised their business more and more, and eventually became a registered political party, the Social-Political Union Uralmash (abbreviated OPS, an intentional play on the Russian law enforcement term OPS, or Organised Crime Society). However, as late as the 2000s, members of the Uralmash were still engaged in criminal activity and racketeering, and most businesses in Yekaterinburg had to pay them protection money.

In 2015, Ex-the Deputy of the Ekaterinburg State Duma and internationally wanted crime boss of "OPS Uralmash" Alexander Kukovyakin, also known as "Kuka", was detained by Interpol in Dubai along with his elder son Konstantin. Kukovyakin was later extradited back to Yekaterinburg and sentenced to 5 years of prison.

Yevgeny Roizman was accused of links with the organisation during his 2013 mayoral campaign.
