= Uralmash =

Heavy machine production business in Yekaterinburg, Russia

- Company type: Joint-stock company
- Industry: Machinery
- Founded: 1933
- Headquarters: Yekaterinburg, Russia
- Revenue: 13,900,000,000 Russian ruble (2020)
- Operating income: 1,753,464,000 Russian ruble (2023)
- Net income: −3,425,000,000 (2019)
- Number of employees: 2,057 (2020)
- Parent: OMZ
- Website: uralmash.ru

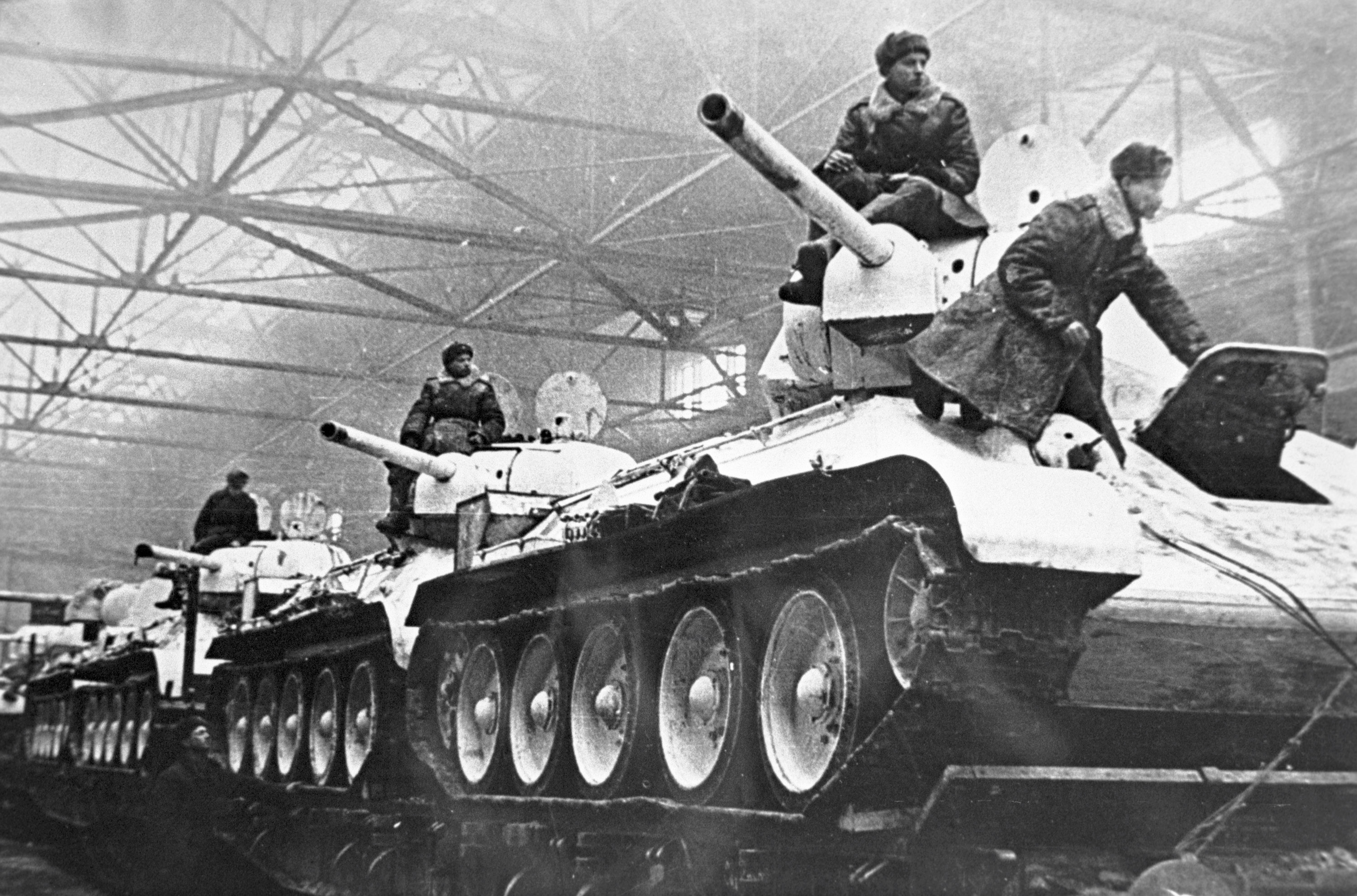
T-34 tanks produced at Uralmash (1942)

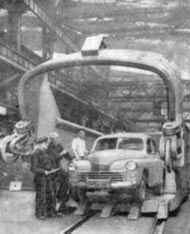
A bucket of one of the first Uralmash dragline excavators with a Pobeda car parked on it, 1952

Uralmash is a heavy machine production business of the Russian engineering corporation OMZ. Its facility is located in Yekaterinburg, Russia, and it is reported to employ around 16,500 people. The surrounding residential area where workers live is also called Uralmash.

Uralmash (Russian: Уралмаш) is an abbreviation of Уральский Машиностроительный Завод, Ural’s’kiy Mashinostroitelnyy Zavod, literally ‘Urals Machine-Building Plant.' Historically, the plant was also called Уральский Завод Тяжелого Машиностроения, Ural’s’kiy Zavod Tyazhelogo Mashinostroyeniya, ‘Ural Heavy Machinery Plant’ or УЗТМ, UZTM, and for a time carried the honorary name of Ordzhonikidze Ural Heavy Machinery Plant, after Grigoriy Ordzhonikidze.

== History ==
The construction of the Ural Heavy Machinery Plant began in 1926, and in 1928 a special "socialist city" for its workers was also elected. The plant began operations in 1933 in compliance with the plans of the Government of the USSR for the industrialization of the country. During the pre-World War II period, Uralmash was dependent on foreign specialists and equipment. It was reported, for instance, that the majority of the plant's machinery was provided by foreign companies "Hydraulik, Schlemann and Wagner", "Krigar", "Sheppard", "AEG", "Mars-Werke", and others. The plant manufactured its products (blast furnace equipment, sintering machines, rolling mills, presses, cranes, etc.) for the mining and metallurgical industries located in the Urals and Siberia. The majority of these products were produced from individual designs. At the same time the plant began to develop military equipment, with the production of the F.F. Petrov designed Howitzer M-30.

During World War II large-scale production of armoured materiel was organized at the plant. At first the plant manufactured armoured tank hulls, but in 1942, Uralmash started producing T-34 tanks and the SU-122 assault gun. A year later, the plant expanded its production of assault guns and began to manufacture SU-85, SU-100, and tank destroyers based on the basic T-34 design. The self-propelled gun mounts built at Uralmash demonstrated their effectiveness on the battlefield as a successful combination of maneuverability of T-34 tanks and huge firepower of ordnance pieces. The plant also produced more than 100 SU-76i assault guns, a variant of the original Soviet SU-76 based upon the chassis and hulls of captured German Panzer III tanks and StuG III assault guns/tank destroyers, most of which fell into Soviet hands following the German defeat at the Battle of Stalingrad in early 1943.

After World War II, the state made large investments in the reconstruction and expansion of the Uralmash plant. This modernisation favoured both increased output and the production of new machines and equipment—shovels, drilling rigs, crushers and mills.

In the 1950s, the state began efforts to equip the aviation and rocket industries with heavy hydraulic presses. Uralmash, in response to this new demand, created a range of this type of equipment.

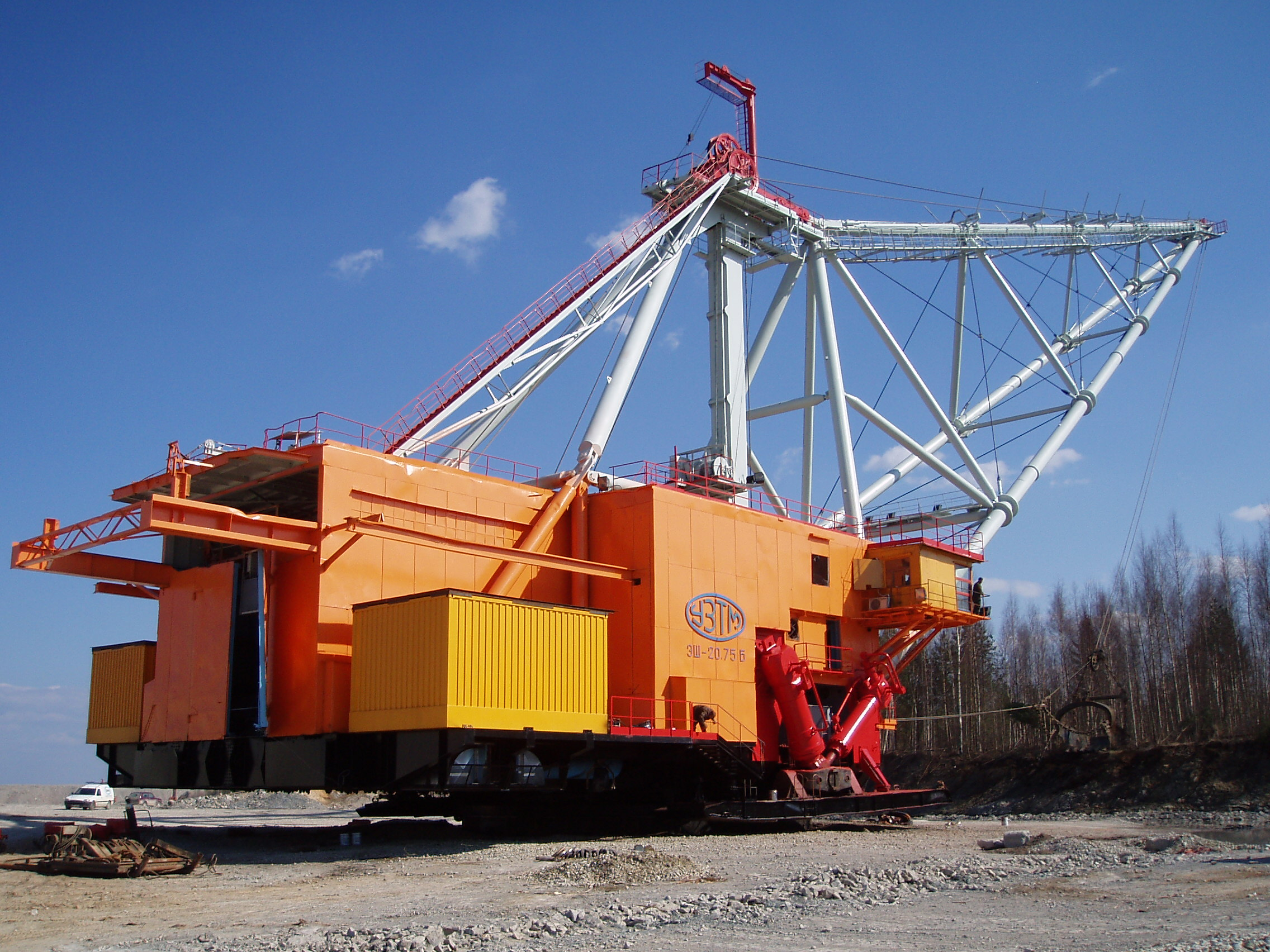
Uralmash-manufactured dragline excavator in the Narva oil shale open pit mine in Estonia.

In 1949 the plant produced the first dragline excavator. In 1960s the plant designed and manufactured draglines with booms 90–100 m long. Now more than 200 walking draglines are in operation at mines in Siberia and the Far East. One third of the total coal amount produced by the open casting is mined with the help of draglines.

The drilling rigs manufactured by Uralmash were of prime importance in the development of oil and gas regions of the USSR, including West Siberia, with its severe climate. The extra deep drilling rigs designed and manufactured at the plant made it possible to reach the depth of 13 km, like at the Kola Superdeep Borehole, and to obtain for the first time rock samples approximately 3 billion years old. In addition to land-based rigs, Uralmash also designs off-shore drilling equipment.

In 1971, Uralmash became the head enterprise of an industrial association. The association also embraced Heavy Machine Research Institute, Upper Pyshminsk Plant of Metal Constructions and Drilling Structures, Nevyansk Casting and Forging Plant, Bulanash Assembly Plant, Sverdlovsk Plant of Drilling and Metallurgical Equipment, and Sverdlovsk Mine Equipment Factory.

For at least part of the late 1980s and early 1990s, the plant was controlled, at least in part, by the Uralmash gang, a racketeering organization.

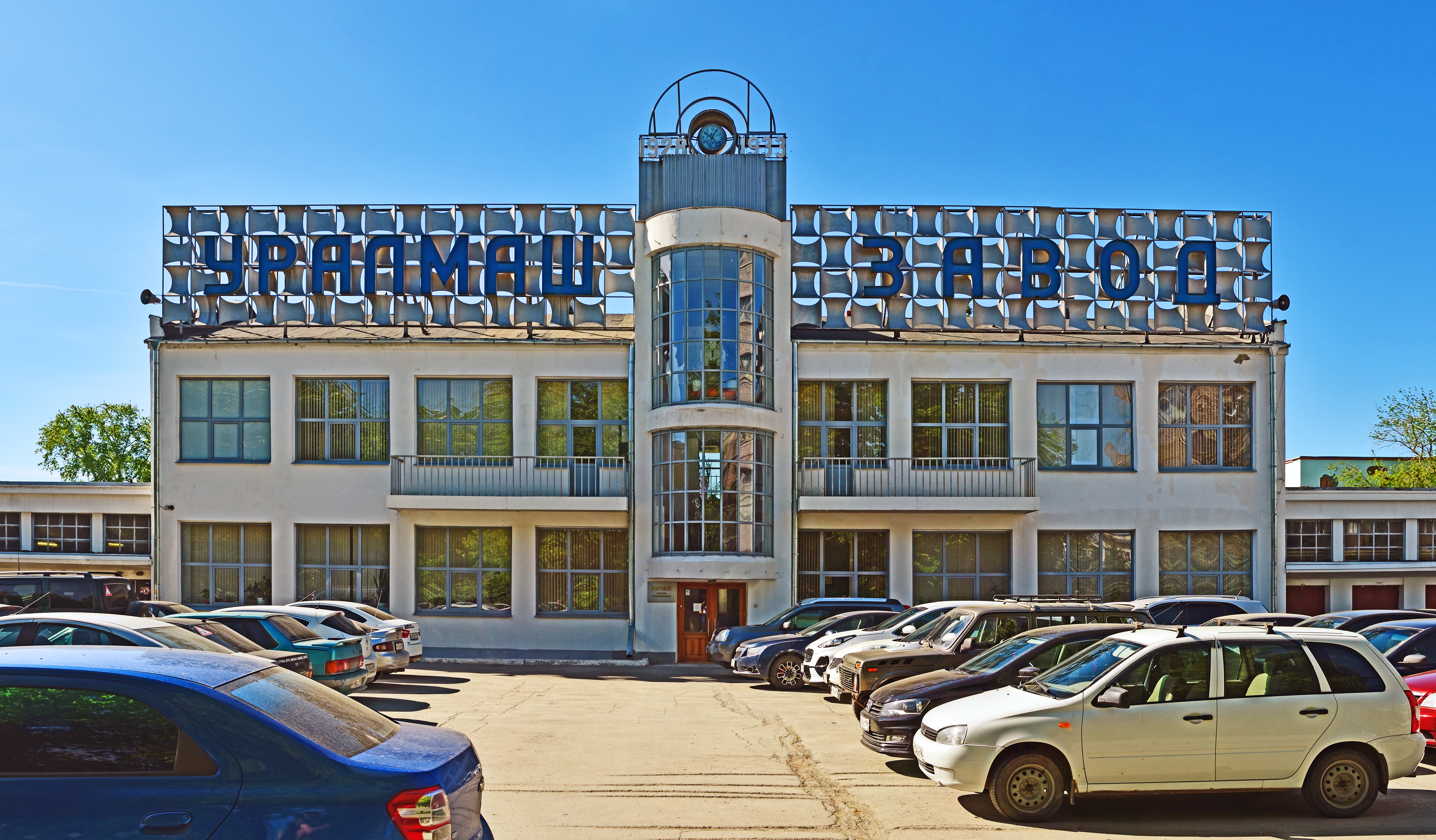
Uralmash entrance gate in 2019

In accordance with Russian Federation law, Uralmash was transformed in December 1992 into an open-end joint stock company under the name "The Ural Heavy Machine Building Plant". In 1996 Uralmash became a part of OMZ, one of Russia's largest engineering corporations, founded and initially led by Kakha Bendukidze.

In 2005, Gazprom purchased a controlling stake in OMZ and Uralmash.

In February 2007, OMZ and Metalloinvest agreed to create a common manufacturing complex. OMZ contributed its holdings in Uralmash to the joint venture while Metalloinvest contributed its holdings in ORMETO-YuUMZ. The consolidation resulted in the creation of a large machine-building conglomerate with a leading position in the CIS metallurgical equipment market with a joint market share in the metallurgical equipment segment in Russia exceeding 40%.

The first director of Uralmash was A. P. Bannikov. Oleg Danchenk served as General Director starting in 2009. Danchenko and First Deputy and Director-General of Uralmash-Engineering Boris Belman resigned their positions at the company in March 2016. The current General Director of Uralmash is Sokolov Sergey Olegovich.

In 2016, Uralmash and Indian steel manufacturer SRB International announced that they were embarking on a joint venture to produce heavy equipment for the Indian steel and mining sector.
