= Alla (female name) =

Alla (Russian: А́лла) is a Russian and Ukrainian female given name.

The Eastern Orthodox Church usually relates the name with Saint Alla, the widow of a Gothic chieftain, martyred in King Athanaric's times. Since the name is also spread among Tatars, there is some speculation that the name has its origin in the pre-Islamic goddess Allat. The name Alla is also widespread in Iceland.

== People ==
- Alla Ablaberdyeva (born 1953), Russian singer
- Alla Aleksandrovska (born 1948), Ukrainian politician
- Alla Alekseyeva (born 1934), Russian rower
- Alla Bayanova (1914–2011), Russian singer
- Alla Beknazarova (born 1984), Ukrainian ice dancer
- Alla Cherkasova (born 1989), Ukrainian wrestler
- Alla Demidova (born 1936), Russian actress
- Alla Dzhioyeva (born 1949), South Ossetian politician
- Alla Gerber (born 1932), Russian journalist
- Alla Gryaznova (born 1937), Russian economist
- Alla Hasanova (born 1970), Azerbaijani volleyball player
- Alla Horska (1929-1970), Ukrainian artist
- Alla Ilchun (1926–1989), Kazakhstani model
- Alla Kazanskaya (1920–2008), Russian actress
- Alla Korot (born 1970), Ukrainian-American actress
- Alla Kostromichova (born 1986), Ukrainian model and television presenter
- Alla Kravets (born 1973), Ukrainian volleyball player
- Alla Kudryavtseva (born 1987), Russian tennis player
- Alla Loboda (born 1998), Russian ice dancer
- Alla Lyshafay (born 1983), Ukrainian footballer
- Alla Nazimova (1879–1945), Russian actress
- Alla Osipenko (1932-2025), Russian ballet dancer
- Alla Parunova, Georgian feminist and queer activist
- Alla Pugacheva (born 1949), Russian singer
- Alla Shekhovtsova (born 1964), Russian figure skating judge
- Alla Sidorovskaya (born 1983), Russian footballer
- Alla Shishkina (born 1989), Russian synchronized swimmer
- Alla Sizova (1939–2014), Russian ballet dancer
- Alla Sosnitskaya (born 1997), Russian gymnast
- Alla O. Starostina, Ukrainian economist
- Alla Tsuper (born 1979), Belarusian skier
- Alla Vazhenina (born 1983), Kazakh weightlifter
- Alla Yaroshinskaya (born 1953), Ukrainian politician
- Alla Zahaikevych (born 1966), Ukrainian composer
