= Anna Arganashvili =

Georgian human rights lawyer

- Education: University of Texas
- Occupation: Human rights lawyer
- Known for: challenging the Georgian government
- Children: a daughter

Anna Arganashvili or Ana Arganashvili (Georgian: ანა არგანაშვილი) is a Georgian human rights lawyer. She was a Fulbright scholar and an MD Anderson Fellow. She successfully challenged her country's COVID-19 quarantine laws and she helped the European Court of Human Rights to request that the government should reconsider its support for children with disabilities. In 2024 the President of Georgia, Salome Zourabichvili, gave Arganashvili the Georgian Order of Honour.

== Life ==
In 2007 she began work at the office of the public defender of Georgia. She became the head of their gender equality department and she left in 2013 and joined the NGO "Partnership for Human Rights" and she became its CEO. The organisation champions the rights of under-represented groups including children and people with disabilities.

She studied at the University of Texas School of Law, United States as part of a Fulbright scholarship from 2019 for a year. In 2020 she returned from studying in America during the COVID-19 pandemic when travel and quarantine laws were in place. She returned to Georgia with her husband and their eleven year old daughter on 27 June. The family were placed in two weeks of quarantine in a hotel in Akhaltsikhe. She complained via Facebook about the conditions. She mentioned the food and particularly the restricted room for her daughter. She received a reply from Natia Mezvrishvili who explained that the state could not afford five star accommodation, but the family were moved to a hotel in the capital. However issues of diet and exercise still caused problems and after her complaints gained support on-line she decided to take the case to the court of appeal. The court upheld her complaint on behalf of the child and the family were allowed to go home and self-isolate. This was the first successful appeal against the quarantine conditions and Irakli Chikovani, a spokesperson for the Prime Minister, said that similar cases involving children should be dealt with on a case by case basis.

In 2021 she was involved when the European Court of Human Rights made an interim order restraining the Georgian government. The government had passed a law that attempted to put limits on the kind of help that the state might give people with disabilities. In the case cited a mother was left to fend for herself with a violent child because the state had assessed that help was needed but it would require two people and that was outside the care offered. Arganashvili and her organisation said that all children should get "a chance of social inclusion, access to education and a life free of violence". The government agreed to think again.

On 8 March (International Women's Day) in 2024 the President of Georgia, Salome Zourabichvili, gave the Georgian Order of Honour to Anna and four other women. The four others were Babutsa Pataraia, Tamuna Museridze, Eliso Amirejibi and Nato Shavlakadze. They were all associated with human rights and the President gave them the award at the Orbeliani Palace.

== Publications include ==
She published an article in 2016 titled, "Empowering Women Against Discrimination in Labour Relations in Georgia" in Anti-Gender Movements on the Rise?
