= Vakhtang Lejava =

Politician

Vakhtang Lejava ვახტანგ ლეჟავა (Georgian)
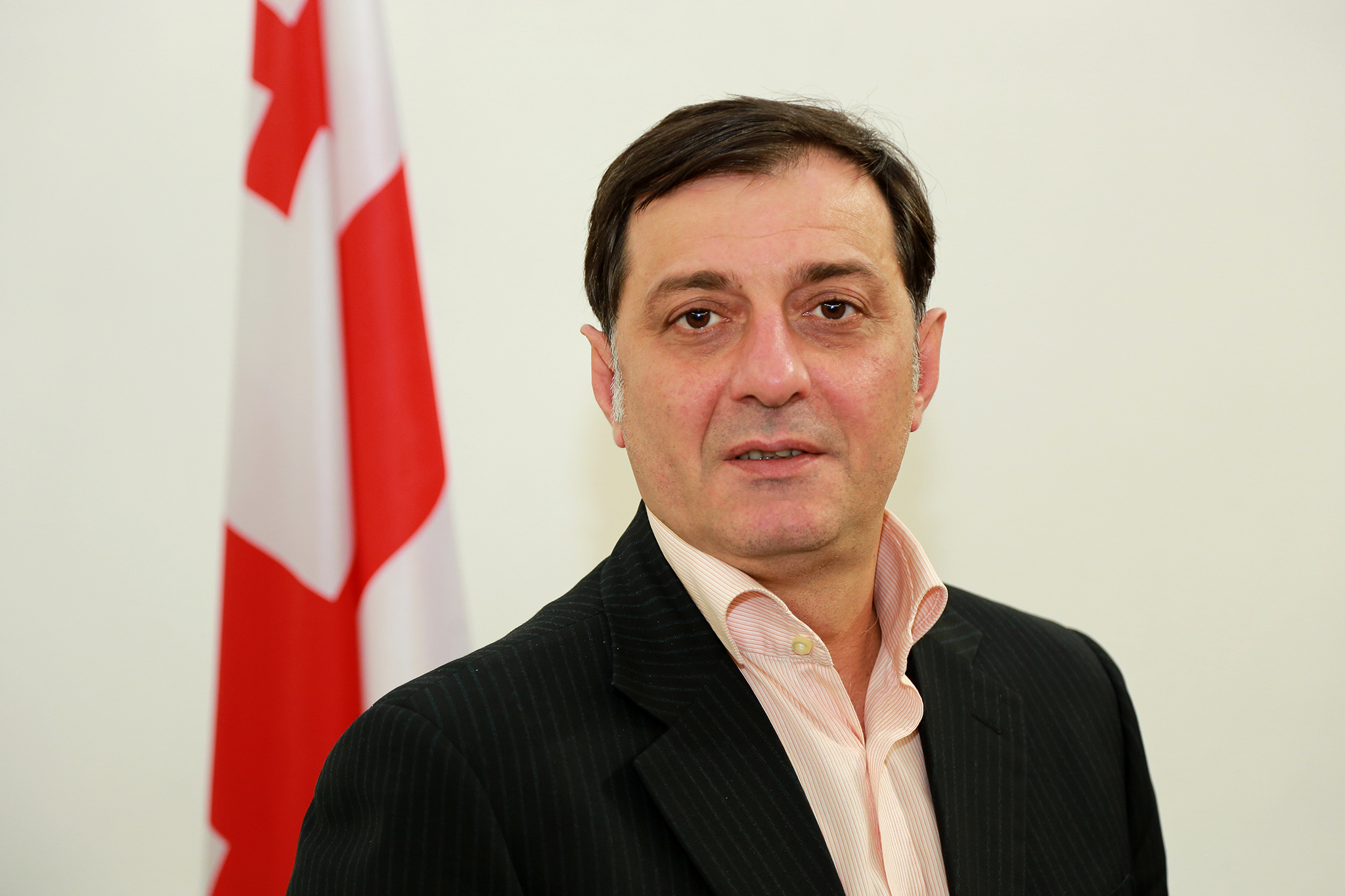
- Vato Lejava in 2010

Rector of the Free and Agriculture Universities
- Incumbent
- Assumed office 2016

Personal details
- Profession: Manager

Vakhtang (Vato) Lejava (Georgian: ვახტანგ ლეჟავა) is a reform-minded Georgian, the Rector of the Free University of Tbilisi and the Agricultural University of Georgia and chief adviser to the prime minister of Georgia in 2009–2012.

He was Deputy Minister of Infrastructure and Deputy Minister of the Economy in 2004 and in 2007–2008, Deputy State Minister of Reforms Coordination 2005–2007, Chief Adviser to the Prime Minister and Chief Adviser on Economic and Governance Affairs in 2009–2012, and Deputy Minister of Finance in 2012.

Vato was a leading member of government bodies that guided a wide range of exemplary economic, structural, regulatory and business climate reforms that covered, but was not limited to: Liberty Act, sector reforms, privatization, international trade and investment climate.

Vato Lejava led and coordinated swift and successful work on business reforms, resulting in Georgia's becoming No. 8 in 2014 globally, moving from No. 112 in 2005 .

He was the negotiator from Georgian government side on the Economic Chapter of the Association Agreement with the EU; A key member of the negotiating team and the negotiator on two topics of the Georgian–EU negotiations on the DCFTA in 2009–2012. He represented Georgia in the Council of Europe GRECO (anti-corruption body), served as a deputy Chairman of the Anti-Corruption Council of Georgia. In this period Georgia moved in the Transparency International CPI Ranking from No. 124 (2003) to No. 51 (2014) outperforming some EU-member states.

Since 2012 he has managed a premier tertiary education institution – Free University of Tbilisi, that has doubled its intake retaining outstanding quality and record high employment rate of the graduates.

In 2014–2016 he was acting CEO of the Knowledge Fund, established by Kakha Bendukidze, that made unprecedented for Georgia private investment of app. 50 mln. USD into higher education.

As a partner of consulting company Reformatics (est. 2012) Vato is currently advising a number of governments in Central Europe, Africa and Asia (2011–2015). Vato was a board member of the Georgian Rugby Union (2011–2015).

== See also ==
- Free University of Tbilisi
- Knowledge Fund
