= Baia Pataraia =

Georgian activist (born 1982)

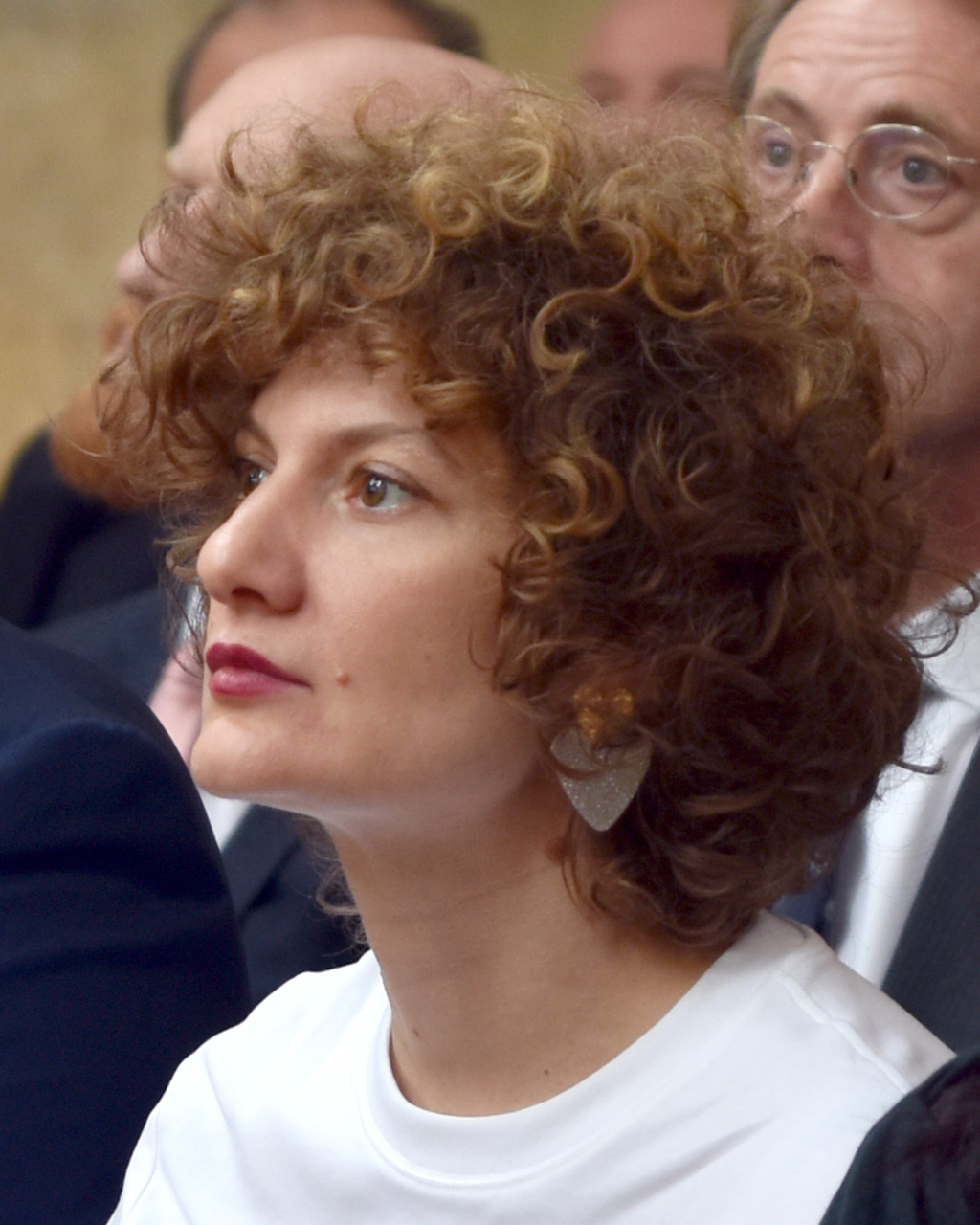
Baia Pataraia in 2024

Baia Pataraia (Georgian: ბაია პატარაია; born 1982) is a leading feminist activist and human rights lawyer in Georgia. She is the director of the women's rights organization Sapari.

== Early life and education ==
Baia Pataraia was born in Tbilisi in 1982.

She studied international law and economics at Tbilisi State University, graduating in 2004, then obtained a master's degree in human rights law from Central European University in Hungary in 2006.

== Career and activism ==
Beginning in 2008, Pataraia became a visiting lecturer at Tbilisi State University and the Free University of Tbilisi. She worked in the Ministry of Justice of Georgia from 2009 to 2013. While there, she helped draft the new law Article 126, which formally defined the crime of domestic violence in Georgia. Her work also included ensuring that sexual harassment was covered by the Law on Gender Equality. She eventually left government to focus on activism full-time.

While working to help rehabilitate torture victims in 2007, she was recruited by the feminist activist Natalia Zazashvili to join Sapari, a nascent human rights organization in Georgia. Sapari initially focused on helping women facing domestic violence. She would go on to become the organization's director, and its mission would expand to include fighting for women's political empowerment and against discrimination.

Pataraia has been heavily involved as a leader in her country's feminist movement since 2012, when she began organizing with the Independent Group of Feminists. By her own account, early activists in Georgia did not explicitly describe themselves as "feminists," but that changed in the early 2010s. In 2014, she led a national campaign against femicide in response to an apparent spike in domestic violence. She is also the chair of Human Rights House Tbilisi and the founder of the semi-formal Georgian Women’s Movement.

Critics have questioned Pataraia's independence as an activist due to her prior work in the federal government, but she argues this experience has made her a more effective advocate. She has also been the target of death threats and street harassment for her work.

== Awards and recognition ==
In 2021 Pataraia was awarded the Kato Mikeladze Award, recognising her work towards improving women's rights. Unusually that year, three women were given the award, the other two recipients were Eliso Rukhadze and Tozu Gulmamedli.

On International Women's Day in 2024 the President of Georgia, Salome Zourabichvili, gave Medals of Honour to Pataraia and four other women. The four others were Tamuna Museridze, Ana Arganashvili, Eliso Amirejibi and Nato Shavlakadze. They were all associated with human rights and the President gave them the award at the Orbeliani Palace.
