= Adoption in Georgia =

Adoption in Georgia deals with the adoption process in the country of Georgia, whereby a person assumes or acquires the permanent, legal status of parenthood in relation to a child under the age of 18 in place of the child's birth or biological parents.

== Legal framework ==
Adoption was outlawed by the Bolshevik government on the grounds that it was an economically exploitative system; however, adoption was legalized again in 1926, with adoptive parents given financial incentives. Following World War II, with hundreds of thousands of displaced and orphaned children, the Soviet government strongly promoted adoption as a moral and patriotic duty.

The Georgian framework of adoption is rooted in both the Soviet legal system and the promotion of the child's welfare and well-being; Georgia joined the Convention on the Rights of the Child in 1994.

Adoption is regulated by the constitution of Georgia, as well as international treaties and agreements, and other domestic laws. The first Georgian adoption law was passed in 1997, partially in response to a growing number of foreign organization that began adopting Georgian children internationally in 1993. On 18 December 2009, the Parliament of Georgia adopted a new Law on Adoption and Foster Care.

=== Foster care ===
Since Georgian independence, there has been a significant increase in the number of children's homes and orphanages. Foster care has been operating as an independent sub-program in Georgia since 2013. Foster care of children over the age of 10 is only permitted with the child's consent; the separation of siblings is only permitted if in the interest of the child(ren). The financial provision given to foster parents varies based on the relationship between the foster parent and children, the acuity of the placement, and if the child has disabilities.

=== Same-sex couple adoptions ===
In March 2024, Georgian Dream, the ruling political party, introduced a bill limiting the rights of LGBT Georgians, including banning adoption by same-sex couples. Implementation of the law, which also bans gender-affirming changes, would likely stall Georgia's efforts to join the European Union.

== International adoptions ==
In Georgia, Articles 44 to 58 of the adoption and foster care law (2012) address international adoptions. Georgia is a party to the Hague Adoption Convention.

== Societal perceptions ==
The Georgian Orthodox Church, as well as the Georgian National Council on Bioethics, will suggest adoption to childless couples over assisted reproductive technology (ART), such as in vitro fertilisation and especially surrogacy. Ilia II of Georgia, the patriarch of the Georgian Orthodox Church, strongly criticized ART as harmful for both society and the emotional development of the resulting child.

== Illegal adoptions ==
In 2021, the journalist Tamuna Museridze learned that she was adopted and established a Facebook group, Vedzeb, to find her birth family. The group was in part responsible for uncovering an illegal adoption market that operated in Georgia from the early 1950s to 2005 (some estimates suggest it began in the 1980s). Museridze estimated up to 100,000 infants were illegally taken from their birth families, who were often told the infants had died and were buried in the hospital cemetery; Georgian hospitals do not have cemeteries.

Prior to the dissolution of the Soviet Union, boys were sold within Georgia for 1,500 maneti, while girls were sold for 1,000 maneti, roughly the equivalent of a year's salary. After 1993, international adoptions became possible and Western families began paying significantly higher prices for Georgian children. Museridze stated the last known case was in 2005, when foreign families were paying around US$20,000 (equivalent to $32,970 in 2025) for an illegally adopted infant.
