= Archil Khomasuridze =

Georgian physician

- არჩილ ხომასურიძე
- Born: Archil Khomasuridze; February 11, 1942; Tbilisi, Georgian SSR, Soviet Union
- Citizenship: Soviet Union → Georgia
- Title: Professor
- Awards: Order of Honor (Georgia)
- Scientific career
- Fields: Reproductive medicine

Archil Khomasuridze (born 11 February 1942, Tbilisi, Georgian SSR) is a Georgian scientist in the field of reproductive medicine, professor, and academician of the International Academy of Human Reproduction. He is an honorary citizen of Tbilisi.

He is the director of the I. Zhordania Institute of Human Reproduction and a member of the editorial board of the scientific and practical journal Reproductive Medicine.

== Biography ==
Khomasuridze received his education at the All-Union Institute of Endocrinology of the Academy of Sciences of the USSR. He began his professional career in 1968 as a resident physician at a maternity hospital in Moscow.

In 1969, he defended his Candidate of Sciences dissertation entitled The Effect of Hypothyroidism on Thyroid Function in Offspring. In 1978, he defended his Doctor of Sciences dissertation entitled The Effect of Hormonal Contraception on the Function of the Thyroid Gland, Adrenal Glands, Pancreas, Reproductive System, Kidneys, and Liver.

During the 1970s, he worked at the All-Union Research Institute of Obstetrics and Gynecology of the Ministry of Health of the USSR under the supervision of Academician Leonid Persiyaninov.

Since 1985, Khomasuridze has served as director of the I. Zhordania Research Institute of Human Reproduction.

Since 1994, he has been professor and head of the Department of Reproductology and Obstetrics and Gynecology at the Faculty of Medicine of Tbilisi State University.

In 2024, a personalized commemorative star was unveiled in front of the former I. Zhordania Institute building.

In 2023, he was awarded the title of Honorary Citizen of Tbilisi.

== Scientific activity ==
Khomasuridze is a participant in international congresses and the author of over 660 scientific publications, 10 textbooks, 6 monographs, and 3 inventions.

His primary scientific goal was the establishment of a modern school of reproductology in Georgia. In 1997, together with colleagues, he initiated the development of this field, the implementation of international standards, and the training of young specialists. As a result, Georgia expanded its scientific and clinical base and began participating in international programs. By 2015, reproductology in Georgia became competitive at the international level. During this period, 14 residents and 48 master's degree holders were trained.

He is the founder of the Department of Reproductology and Obstetrics and Gynecology at Ivane Javakhishvili Tbilisi State University and the first president of the Georgian Association of Reproductive Health.

== Awards ==
- Lenin Komsomol State Prize of the USSR (1980)
- Order of Honor (Georgia) (2010)
- Honorary Citizen of Tbilisi (2023)
