= Nato Shavlakadze =

Georgian human rights activist

- Born: January 15, 1966 (age 60); Tbilisi
- Education: Agricultural University of Georgia
- Occupation: activist
- Known for: co-founder of the National Network of Protection from Violence

Nato Shavlakadze or Nato Shavlaqadze (Georgian: ნატო შავლაყაძე; born January 15, 1966) is a Georgian human rights activist. In 2024 she and Eliso Amirejibi were awarded the Georgian Order of Honor for their work with the National Network of Protection from Violence.

== Life ==
Shavlakadze was born in the Georgian capital of Tbilisi in 1966. She studied technology and law at the Agricultural University of Georgia in her home city. She then worked initially as a laboratory assistant in a number of organisations.

In 1998 she was elected as the chair of the women's organisation named "Peony" and in 2003 she began to lead Georgia's "National Network of Protection from Violence" which she and Eliso Amirejibi had founded with the support of the Open Society Georgia Foundation. In the following year the first Georgian shelter for families facing domestic violence was opened in Tbilisi and in 2005 the organisation partnered with similar organisations to draft new laws for Georgia that reflected the modern approach to dealing with domestic violence. The organisation soon had a dozen regional committees.

On International Women's Day on 8 March 2024 the President of Georgia, Salome Zourabichvili, spoke about the need to control violence against women and femicide. She saw it as a shame to the country. She gave Georgian Orders of Honour to Nato and four other women. The four others were Babutsa Pataraia, Tamuna Museridze, Eliso Amirejibi and Ana Arganashvili. They were all associated with human rights and the President gave them the award at the Orbeliani Palace.
