= Ivry-sur-Seine =

- Commune
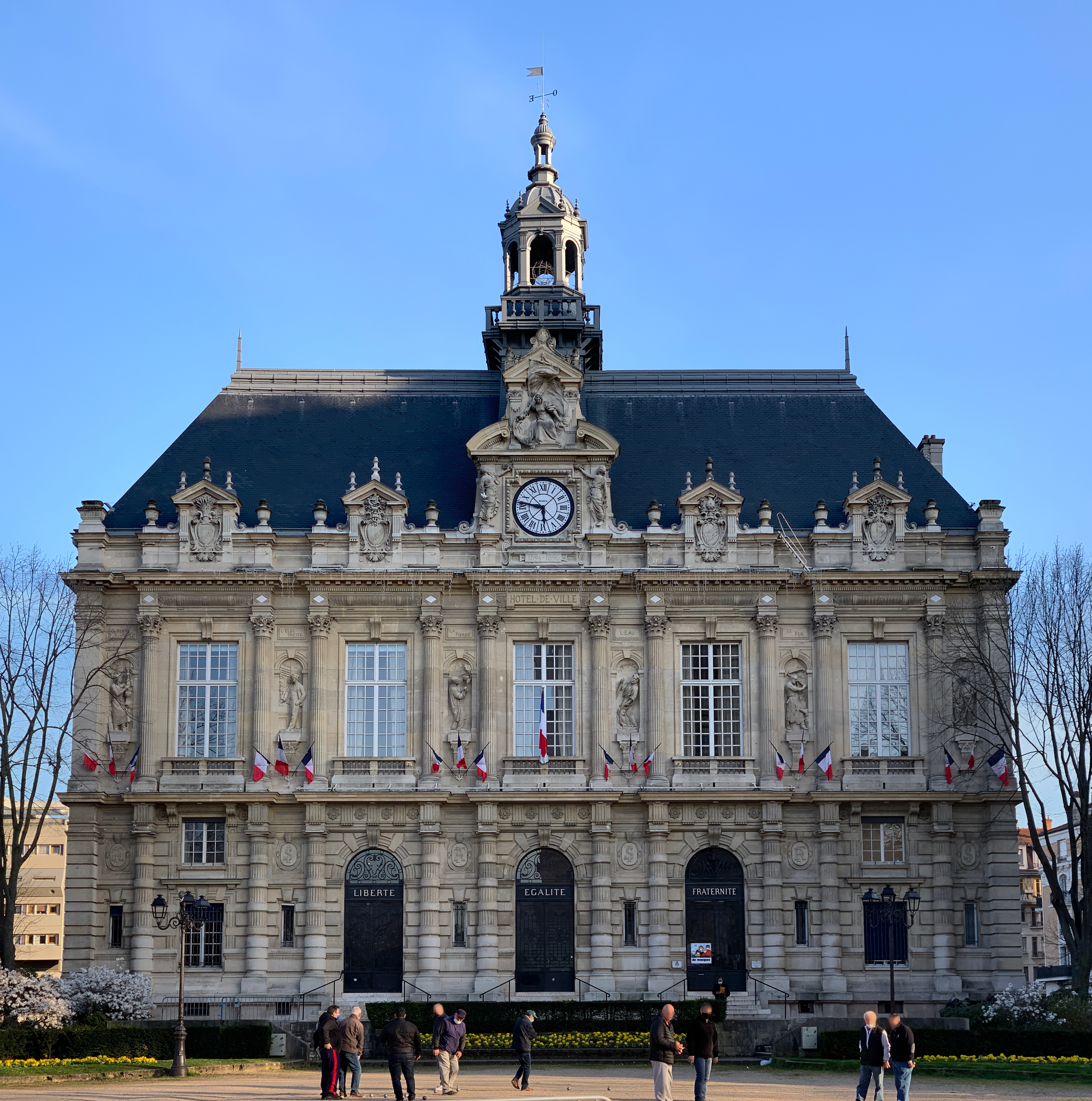
- The Hôtel de Ville

- Coat of arms

- Location (in red) within Paris inner suburbs
- Location of Ivry-sur-Seine
- Location within France Location within Île-de-France (region)
- Coordinates: 48°48′28″N 2°22′29″E
- Country: France
- Region: Île-de-France
- Department: Val-de-Marne
- Arrondissement: L'Haÿ-les-Roses
- Canton: Ivry-sur-Seine
- Intercommunality: Grand Paris

Government
  - Mayor (2026–32): Philippe Bouyssou (PCF)
- Area^{1}: 6.10 km^{2} (2.36 sq mi)
- Highest elevation: 68 m (223 ft)
- Lowest elevation: 28 m (92 ft)
- Population (2023): 65,064
  - Density: 10,700/km^{2} (27,600/sq mi)
- Demonym: Ivryens
- Time zone: UTC+01:00 (CET)
  - Summer (DST): UTC+02:00 (CEST)
- INSEE/Postal code: 94041 /94200
- Website: www.ivry94.fr
- ^{1} French Land Register data, which excludes lakes, ponds, glaciers > 1 km^{2} (0.386 sq mi or 247 acres) and river estuaries.

Ivry-sur-Seine (French pronunciation: [ivʁi syʁ sɛn]; lit. 'Ivry-on-Seine') or simply Ivry is a commune in the Val-de-Marne department in the southeastern suburbs of Paris, France. It is located 5.3 km (3 1/4 mi) from the centre of Paris.

Paris's main Asian district, the Quartier Asiatique in the 13th arrondissement, borders the commune and now extends into the northern parts of Ivry. Asian commercial activity, especially Chinese and Vietnamese, has greatly increased in Ivry-sur-Seine during the past two decades. The commune contains one of the highest concentrations of Vietnamese in France, who began settling in the city in the late 1970s after the Vietnam War.

Politically, Ivry-sur-Seine has historically demonstrated strong electoral support for the French Communist Party (PCF). Between 1925 and today (except for the period of German occupation in World War II), the office of mayor was held by just four individuals: Georges Marrane, Jacques Laloë, Pierre Gosnat and Philippe Bouyssou, all members of the Communist Party.

Ivry-sur-Seine is twinned with Bishop Auckland in County Durham, England.

== Name ==
Originally, Ivry-sur-Seine was called simply Ivry. The name Ivry comes from Medieval Latin Ivriacum or Ibriacum, perhaps meaning "estate of Eburius (the Latinized form of the Gallic patronym Eburos)", a Gallo-Roman landowner.

In 1897, the name of the commune officially became Ivry-sur-Seine (meaning "Ivry upon Seine"), in order to distinguish it from other communes of France also called Ivry.

== History ==
On 1 January 1860, the city of Paris was enlarged by annexing neighbouring communes. On that occasion, about a third of the commune of Ivry-sur-Seine was annexed to Paris, and now forms the Chinatown area of the 13th arrondissement of Paris. The Hôtel de Ville was completed in 1896.

Ivry-sur-Seine is perhaps most famous as the place of execution of Jean Bastien-Thiry in March 1963. Richard Ellman also notes that James Joyce's daughter, Lucia, received psychiatric treatment in the commune's hospital in 1936 and was visited by both Joyce and Samuel Beckett.

== Economy ==
Fnac has its head office in the commune. The head office moved there in 2008. E.Leclerc's head office is in the commune.

== Transport ==
Ivry-sur-Seine is served by two stations on the Paris Métro Line 7: Pierre et Marie Curie and Mairie d'Ivry.

The east of the commune is served by Ivry-sur-Seine station on Paris RER line C with stops at the Bibliothèque Nationale de France and the city centre.

Orly Airport is located to the south of Ivry-sur-Seine.

== Education ==
Senior high schools:

- Collège et lycée Romain Rolland
- Lycée technique Fernand Léger

Colleges and universities:

- ESIEA (university)
- ESME Sudria
- École des technologies numériques appliquées
- Institut polytechnique des sciences avancées
- IONIS School of Technology and Management

== Images from Ivry ==
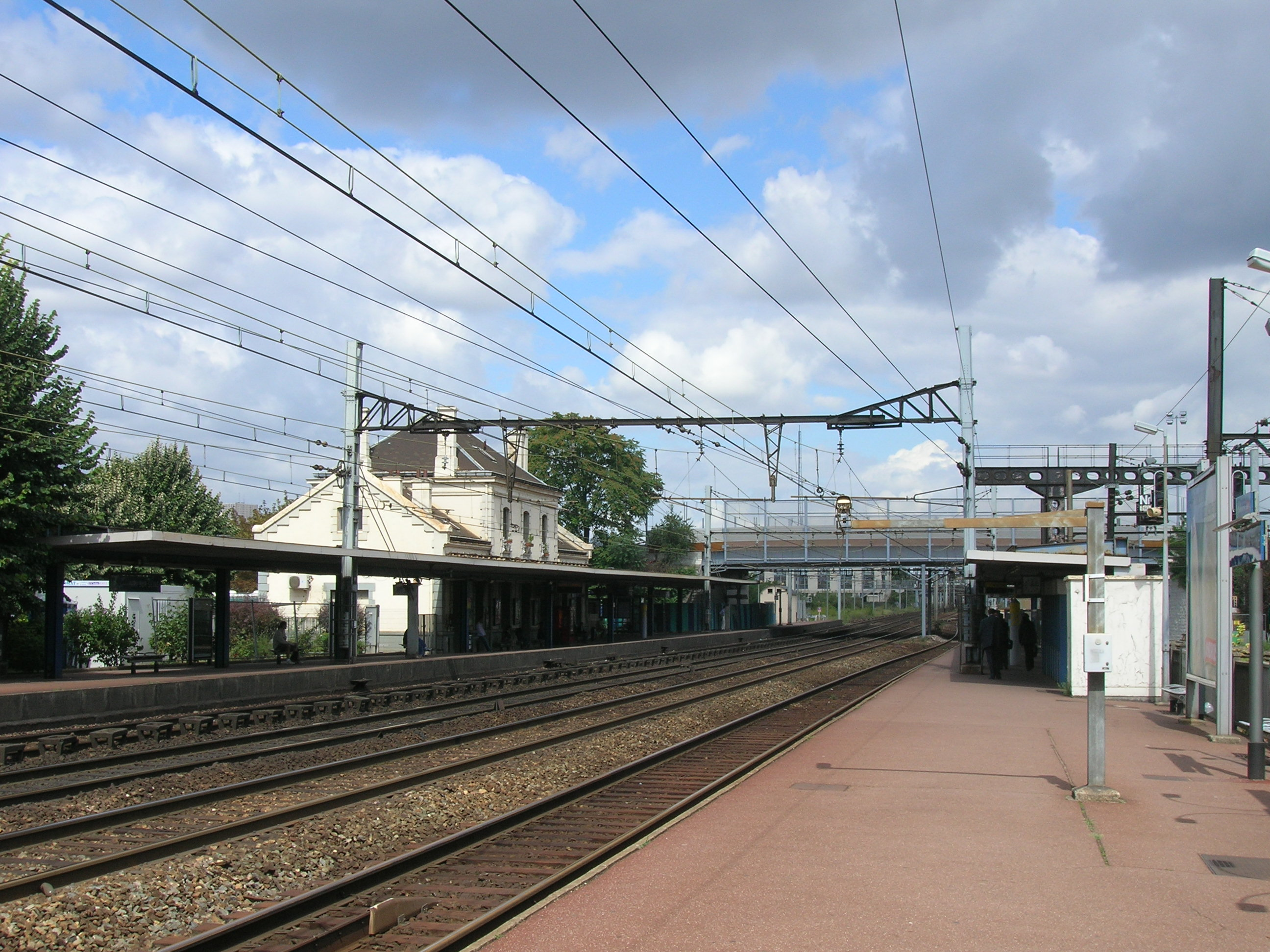
Ivry RER Railway Station

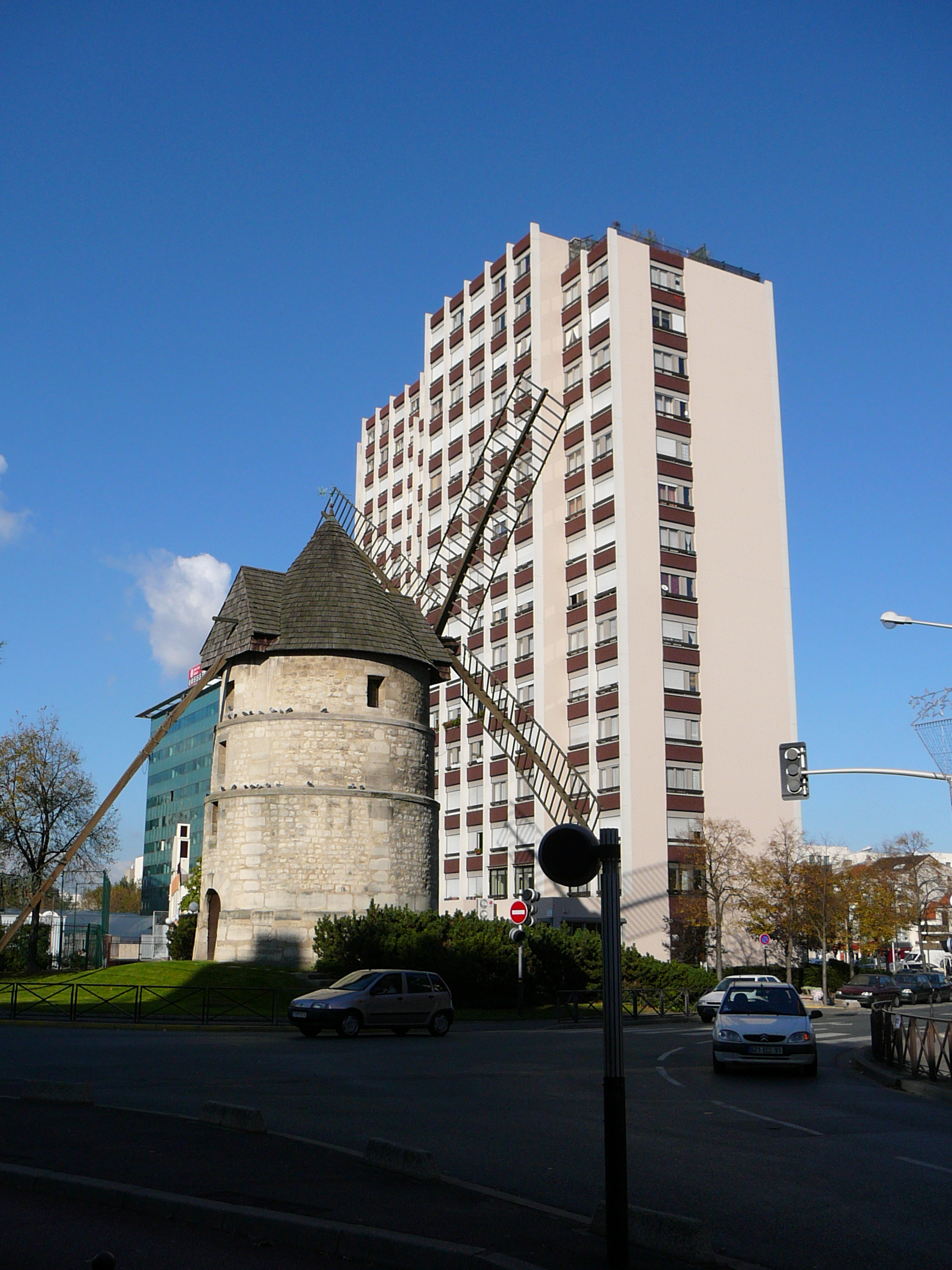
Old Windmill (Moulin de la Tour) near the 13th Arrondissement

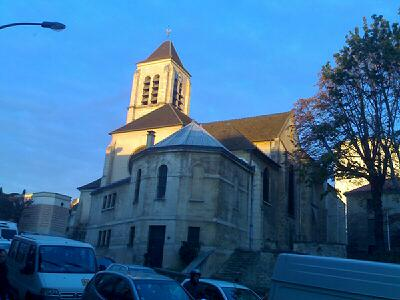
October Sky
Ivry sur Seine Church

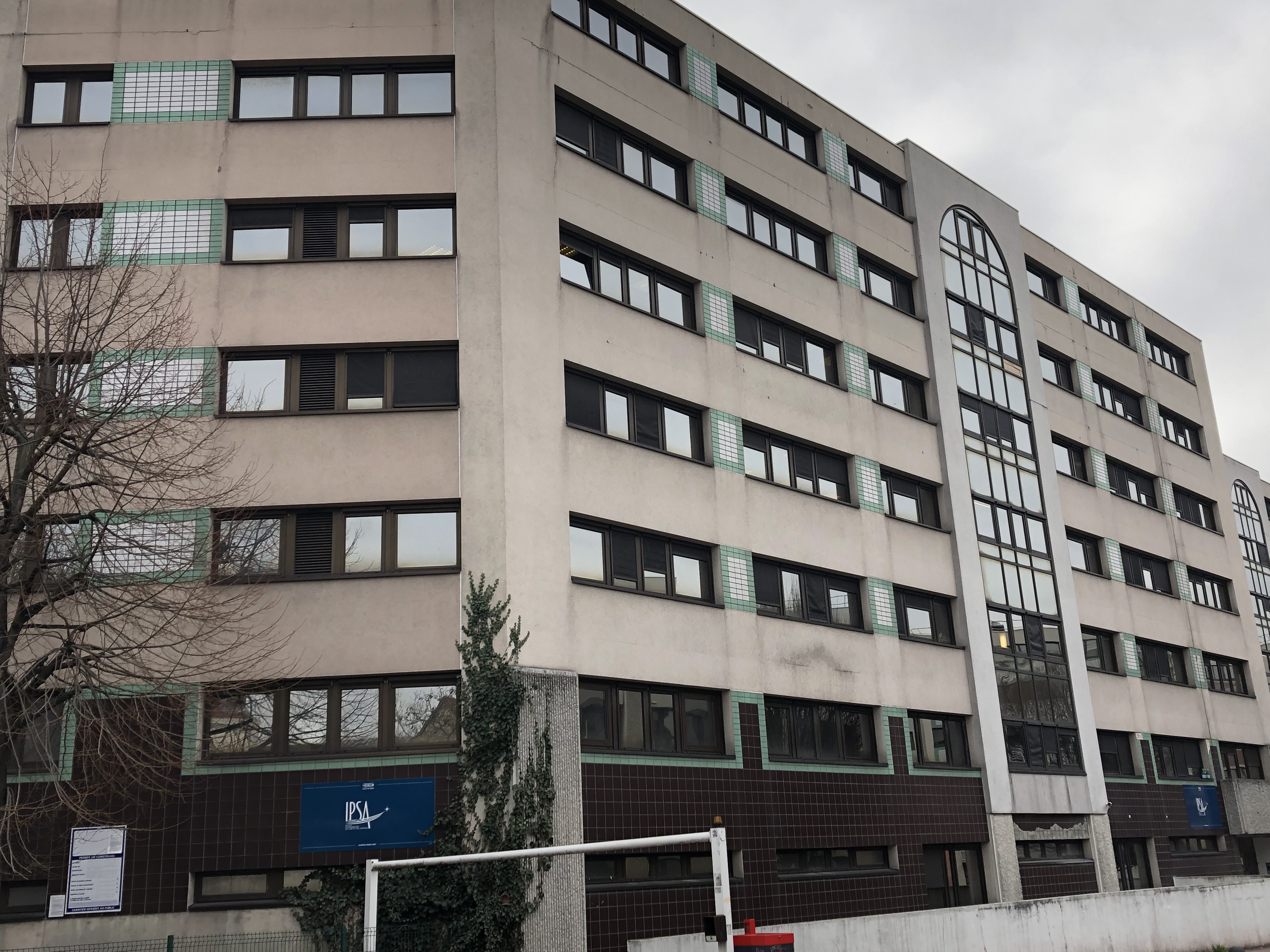
Main Building IPSA Paris

Les Étoiles d'Ivry

== Demographics ==
Historical population

Year	Pop.	±% p.a.
1793	1,400	—
1800	1,008	−4.58%
1806	1,200	+2.95%
1821	1,359	+0.83%
1831	2,875	+7.78%
1836	3,959	+6.61%
1841	5,172	+5.49%
1846	6,880	+5.87%
1851	7,671	+2.20%
1856	13,239	+11.53%
1861	7,056	−11.83%
1866	10,199	+7.65%
1872	13,165	+4.35%
1876	15,247	+3.74%
1881	18,442	+3.88%
1886	21,076	+2.71%
1891	22,357	+1.19%
1896	24,919	+2.19%
1901	28,585	+2.78%

Year	Pop.	±% p.a.
1906	33,198	+3.04%
1911	38,307	+2.90%
1921	43,963	+1.39%
1926	46,598	+1.17%
1931	48,929	+0.98%
1936	44,859	−1.72%
1946	42,445	−0.55%
1954	47,765	+1.49%
1962	54,731	+1.72%
1968	60,455	+1.67%
1975	62,856	+0.56%
1982	55,699	−1.71%
1990	53,619	−0.47%
1999	50,972	−0.56%
2007	55,583	+1.09%
2012	58,579	+1.06%
2017	62,052	+1.16%
2023	65,064	+0.79%

Source: EHESS and INSEE (1968-2023)

=== Immigration ===
Place of birth of residents of Ivry-sur-Seine in 1999
Born in metropolitan France	Born outside metropolitan France			
73.5%	26.5%			
73.5%	Born in overseas France	Born in foreign countries with French citizenship at birth^{1}	EU-15 immigrants^{2}	Non-EU-15 immigrants
73.5%	2.2%	2.7%	4.7%	16.9%
^{1} This group is made up largely of former French settlers, such as pieds-noirs in Northwest Africa, followed by former colonial citizens who had French citizenship at birth (such as was often the case for the native elite in French colonies), as well as to a lesser extent foreign-born children of French expatriates. A foreign country is understood as a country not part of France in 1999, so a person born for example in 1950 in Algeria, when Algeria was an integral part of France, is nonetheless listed as a person born in a foreign country in French statistics.^{2} An immigrant is a person born in a foreign country not having French citizenship at birth. An immigrant may have acquired French citizenship since moving to France, but is still considered an immigrant in French statistics. On the other hand, persons born in France with foreign citizenship (the children of immigrants) are not listed as immigrants.

As of circa 1998 Ivry and Vitry-sur-Seine had a combined Asian population of 3,600. That year about 250 Asians from those communes worked in the 13th arrondissement of Paris, and the overall demographics of Ivry and Vitry Asians were similar to those in the 13th arrondissement.

== Notable people ==
- Hannibal Mejbri, football player
- Luc Abalo, handball player
- Nicolas Appert (1749–1841), inventor, spent a number of years in Ivry-sur-Seine
- Antonin Artaud, writer, died in Ivry-sur-Seine on 4 March 1948.
- Yohann Auvitu, ice hockey player
- Souleymane Bamba, footballer
- Paul Boccara, economist and historian.
- Pierre-Claude-Victor Boiste (1765–1824), lexicographer
- Yannick Bonheur, figure skater
- Pierre Contant d'Ivry (1698–1777), architect born in Ivry-sur-Seine.
- Raymond Daudel (1920–2006), chemist, died in Ivry-sur-Seine
- Mana Dembele, footballer
- Kadidiatou Diani, footballer
- Jean Ferrat, singer, spent a number of years in Ivry-sur-Seine before settling in Ardèche.
- Catherine Ferry, singer
- Renée Gailhoustet
- Alla Ilchun, fashion model, a muse for Christian Dior
- Reda Kateb, actor
- Tripy Makonda, footballer
- Dany N'Guessan, footballer
- Doriane Pin, racing driver
- Jean Renaudie, architect and founder of the Atelier de Montrouge who was responsible for the complete renovation of Ivry town centre.
- Henri Rol-Tanguy, member of the French Resistance, died in Ivry-sur-Seine on September 8, 2002
- Bakary Sako, footballer
- Antoine Spire, sociologist and writer.
- Maurice Thorez, former leader of the French Communist Party, elected deputy for d'Ivry-sur-Seine in 1932 until his death in 1964.
- Mickael Toti, basketball player
- Makan Traore, footballer
- Bano Traore, athlete

== See also ==
- Communes of the Val-de-Marne department
