= Knowledge Fund =

Georgian educational public charity

Knowledge Fund Georgian: ცოდნის ფონდი
- Founded: 2007
- Founder: Kakha Bendukidze, former Minister of Economics of Georgia
- Purpose: Humanitarian
- Location: Tbilisi
- Region served: Georgia
- Key people: Kakha Bendukidze; Anastasia Bendukidze-Goncharova (CEO)

The Knowledge Fund (KF, Georgian: ცოდნის ფონდი) a non-profit, charity organization, was founded by Kakha Bendukidze in 2007. KF is the largest endowment in higher education in Georgia to "recruit the country's most talented and motivated students, to offer several schemes to ensure accessibility to the university regardless of students' financial resources."

Knowledge Fund focuses on the most critical area for modern Georgia: education. It works principally through partnerships with like-minded individuals, organizations serving and providing financial aid to the most talented students in Georgia. Its headquarters is in Tbilisi, Georgia.

Between 2007 and 2012 KF invested over 50 million USD, this being an unprecedented volume of private investment in tertiary education in Georgia.

The main projects, maintained by the Knowledge Fund are the Free University of Tbilisi and Agricultural University of Georgia.

In October 2014 the KF won a Court case against the Ministry of Economics of Georgia. The decision of the court highlighted the "fulfilment of Investment Obligations by the Foundation towards the Ministry."

The executive head of the Foundation is Kakha Bendukidze's daughter – Anastasia Bendukidze-Goncharova.
