= Hôtel de Ville, Ivry-sur-Seine =

Town hall in Ivry-sur-Seine, France

Hôtel de Ville
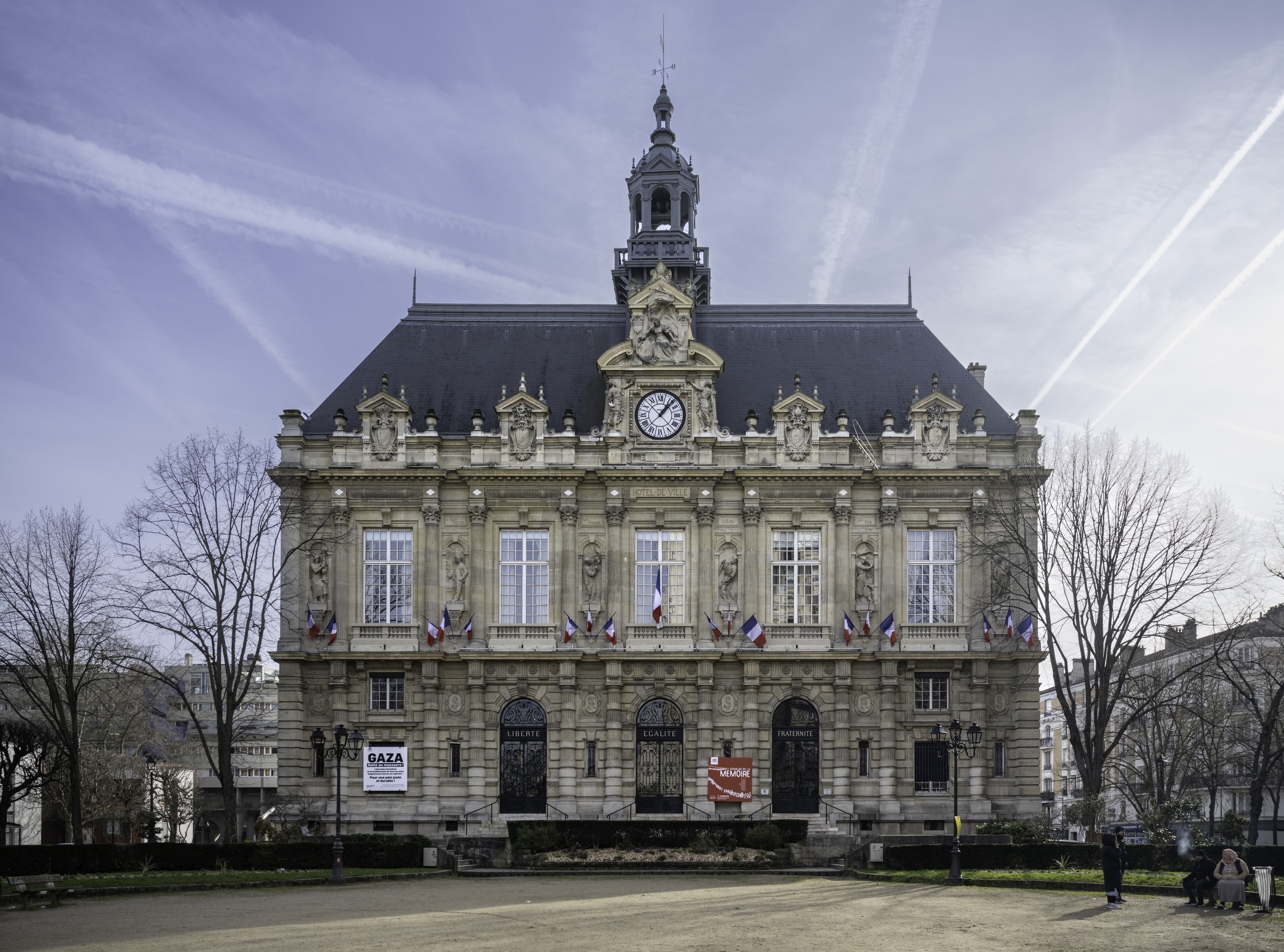
- The main frontage of the Hôtel de Ville in January 2024
- Interactive map of the Hôtel de Ville area

General information
- Type: City hall
- Architectural style: Louis XIV style
- Location: Ivry-sur-Seine, France
- Coordinates: 48.8120°N 2.3875°E
- Completed: 1896

Design and construction
- Architect: Chancel Adrien

The Hôtel de Ville (French pronunciation: [otɛl də vil], City Hall) is a municipal building in Ivry-sur-Seine, Val-de-Marne, in the southern suburbs of Paris, standing on Esplanade Georges Marrane. It has been included on the Inventaire général des monuments by the French Ministry of Culture since 1994.

== History ==
Following the French Revolution, the new council initially held its meetings in the house of the mayor of the day. However, in the mid-19th century, it decided to acquire a dedicated municipal building: the property it selected was a private house on Rue de Seine (now Avenue Georges Gosnat). The house was designed by Jacques Hardouin-Mansart de Sagonne and was completed in 1739. It accommodated a school established by the educator, Pierre-Philibert Pompée, from 1853. In August 1870, in the context of the threat of the Franco-Prussian War, the council relocated to the relative safety of a property in central Paris but, after the threat had subsided in 1871, the council acquired the house on Rue de Seine.

In the late 19th century, the council decided to commission a more substantial town hall on the same site, just to the southeast of the original building, which was later demolished. The foundation stone was laid by the Secretary-General of the Seine Prefecture, Léon Bruman, on 3 February 1895. It was designed by Chancel Adrien in the Louis XIV style, built in ashlar stone and was officially opened by the mayor, Émile-Louis Bruyer, on 19 April 1896.

The design involved a symmetrical main frontage of five bays facing onto Rue de Seine. The central three bays featured round headed openings containing doorways with iron grills, voussoirs and keystones. The outer bays contained pairs of casement windows, stacked one on top of the other, while the first floor was fenestrated with five tall casement windows with balustrades, moulded surrounds and keystones. The bays on the ground floor were flanked by banded Doric order columns supporting entablatures and cornices, while the bays on the first floor were flanked by fluted Corinthian order columns supporting entablatures and modillioned cornices. The bays on the first floor were flanked by six niches containing statues reflecting local industries: they were sculpted by Léon Fagel, Adolphe Geoffroy, Jean Hugues and Camille Lefèvre. Above the central bay, there was a clock flanked by pilasters supporting a pediment while, above the other bays, there were heraldic shields flanked by pilasters supporting pediments. Internally, the principal rooms were the Salle des Mariages (wedding room) and the Salle du Conseil (council chamber).

During the Paris insurrection on 19 August 1944, part of the Second World War, the town hall was seized by the French Resistance. This was just a week before the liberation of the town by the French 2nd Armoured Division, commanded by General Philippe Leclerc, on 25 August 1944.

Works of art in the town hall include three frescoes painted on plywood by Fernand Léger in the early 1950s. They illustrate the poem, Liberté, written by Paul Éluard during the German occupation of France.
