= Kato Mikeladze Award =

Human rights award

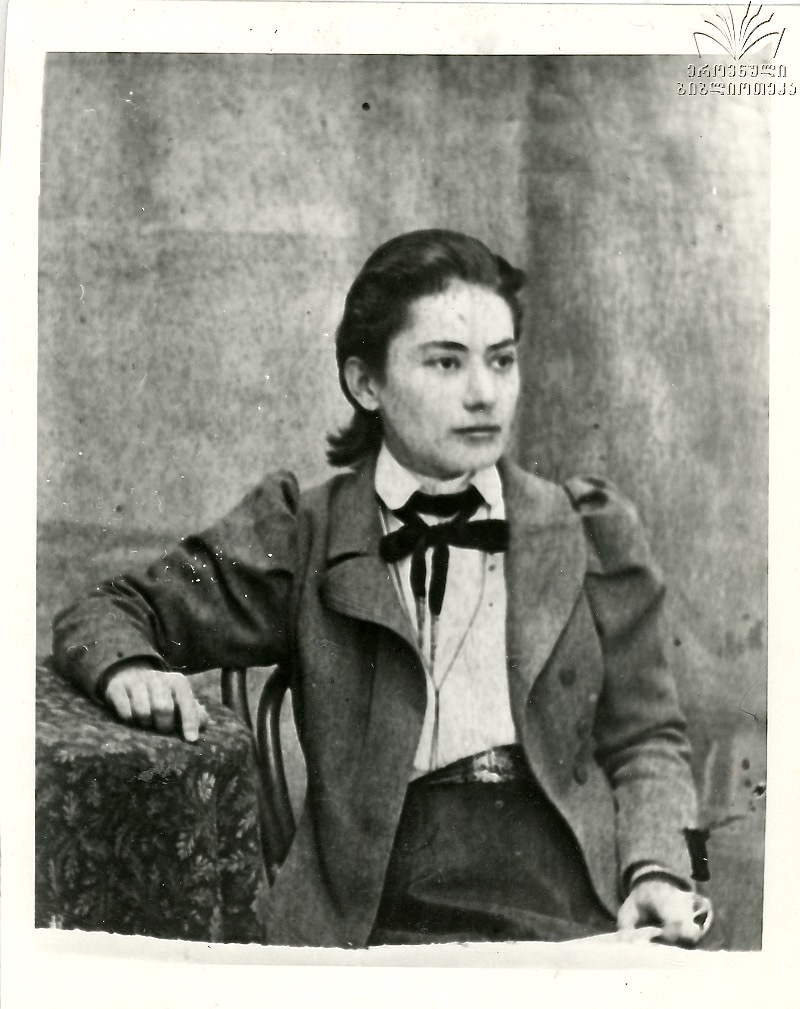
- Kato Mikeladze in Paris, 1909
- Awarded for: Women's rights activism in Georgia
- Sponsored by: Women's Fund in Georgia
- Country: Georgia

The Kato Mikeladze Award (Georgian: კატო მიქელაძის პრემია, romanized: k'at'o mikeladzis p'remia) is awarded by the Women's Fund in Georgia, recognising the work of women's rights activists in Georgia. It is named after the feminist and journalist Kato Mikeladze. It was established in 2013. It is usually awarded on 29 November – International Women Human Rights Defenders Day. No award was made in 2022.

== Recipients ==
- 2013 - Ekaterine Aghdgomelashvili
- 2014 - Marina Tabukashvili
- 2015 - Lia Ukleba
- 2016 - Eka Skhiladze
- 2017 - Ketevan Khidasheli
- 2018 - Ida Bakhturidze
- 2019 - Khatia Ghoghoberidze
- 2020 - Mariam Kajaia
- 2021 - Baia Pataraia, Eliso Rukhadze and Tozu Gulmamedli
- 2022 - no award
- 2023 - Alla Parunova
