= Pierre-Claude-Victor Boiste =

French lexicographer (1765–1824)

Pierre-Claude-Victor Boiste (1765 – 24 April 1824) was a French lexicographer born in Paris. He is most famous as the editor of the Dictionnaire universel de la langue française, first published in 1800.

Originally trained at the Dammartin-Juilly Royal Academy at Goële (now Dammartin-en-Goële, Seine et Marne), as a young man he studied law and became a practicing lawyer. However, he quit legal work to pursue publishing, ultimately founding a moderately prestigious press. In 1800, his health failing him, he retired to a house in the country at Ivry-sur-Seine to devote himself to linguistic, scientific and literary pursuits, producing five works, of which his dictionary is the most famous.

== Bibliography ==
- Dictionnaire universel de la langue française (Paris, Desray, 1800; ~1300 pp)
- L'Univers, poème en prose et en douze chants, suivi de notes et d’observations sur le système de Newton et la théorie physique de la Terre, appelée plus généralement l’Univers délivré (Paris, Boiste, 1801; ~500 pp)
- Dictionnaire de Géographie Universelle, ancienne et moderne, d’après le plan de Vosgien (Paris, Desray, 1806; 712 pp)
- Nouveaux Principes de Grammaire et Solutions des Difficultés de la langue d’après la Génération des Idées (Paris, Verdière, 1820; 712 pp)
- Lettres d’après l’Association des idées (Paris, Verdière, 1821-1824, five volumes)
