= Tamuna Museridze =

Georgian journalist

Tamar Museridze
- Born: 10 October 1984 (age 41); Georgia
- Other name: Tamuna Museridze
- Occupations: Journalist; adoption researcher
- Employer: Georgian Television Company
- Known for: Uncovering a Scandal of Stolen Babies

Tamar (or Tamuna) Museridze (Georgian: თამარ მუსერიძე; born 10 October 1980Year. (22 September 1980)) is a Georgian journalist who discovered that a large number of Georgian babies were stolen from new mothers. She founded an organization where thousands are trying to see these children reunited. She has been honored by her country and the BBC for founding the "Vedzeb" organisation.

== Life ==
Museridze was born in about 1984. She went to work for the Georgian television company when she was eighteen. She was surprised at the age of 31 when she discovered that her parents were not her biological mother and father as she discovered that she was adopted. She had discovered this when she found errors on her own birth certificate as she sorted through her (de facto) mother's belongings after her death.

Museridze had founded the organisation "Looking For" (Vedzeb) after finding out that a large number of babies were stolen from new mothers. The nurses and doctors told the parents that the baby had died, but actually the baby was sold to other parents for them to adopt. The babies were sold for an amount equal to an average yearly wage. Her organisation is credited with reuniting hundreds of families, but as of 2023 she had not found her own biological family. An example was Irma Dvalishvili who in 1990 gave birth to twins who were said to be fine, but the next day she was told that one of them had died. It was only after they insisted that a body was returned to the parents, but they assumed that this was the dead twin. The surviving twin, Mariam Kobelashvili, became suspicious when she found that the birth and the death of her twin had never been recorded. The hospital said that it had destroyed all the old records. In 2022, she was posting pictures of herself on social media, at different ages, in the hope of finding her lost sister.

Another case that came to light involved identical twins, Amy and Ano. One of them had seen her twin on Georgia's Got Talent when she was twelve but her parents had told her that "everyone has a doppelganger". Her de facto parents did not know that she had a twin and they hadn't told her that she was adopted (or the amount money that they had paid for her).

It is estimated that there may be thousands of missing babies, as this scheme was running across multiple hospitals and in time the babies were also being sent abroad. One boy claimed that he had found his biological parents, who told him that their child had died. However, DNA results confirmed that he was correct and he was the son they had been told had died. Some parents were told that their children were buried in the hospital cemetery, but investigations reveal that no hospital in Georgia had a separate cemetery.

In 2023 Museridze was included in the BBC's annual list of 100 inspirational women and she was incredulous that the BBC had shown interest in a story in Georgia.

On International Women's Day in 2024 the President of Georgia, Salome Zourabichvili, gave Medals of Honour to Museridze and four other women. The four others were Babutsa Pataraia, Ana Arganashvili, Eliso Amirejibi and Nato Shavlakadze. They were all associated with human rights and the President gave them the award at the Orbeliani Palace. She was thanked for her initiative, courage and responsibility in founding the "Vedzeb" organisation.

Museridze located her biological parents in summer 2024, meeting her father, who did not know she existed.
