= Moulin de la Tour (Ivry-sur-Seine) =

Windmill in Ivry-sur-Seine, Val-de-Marne, France

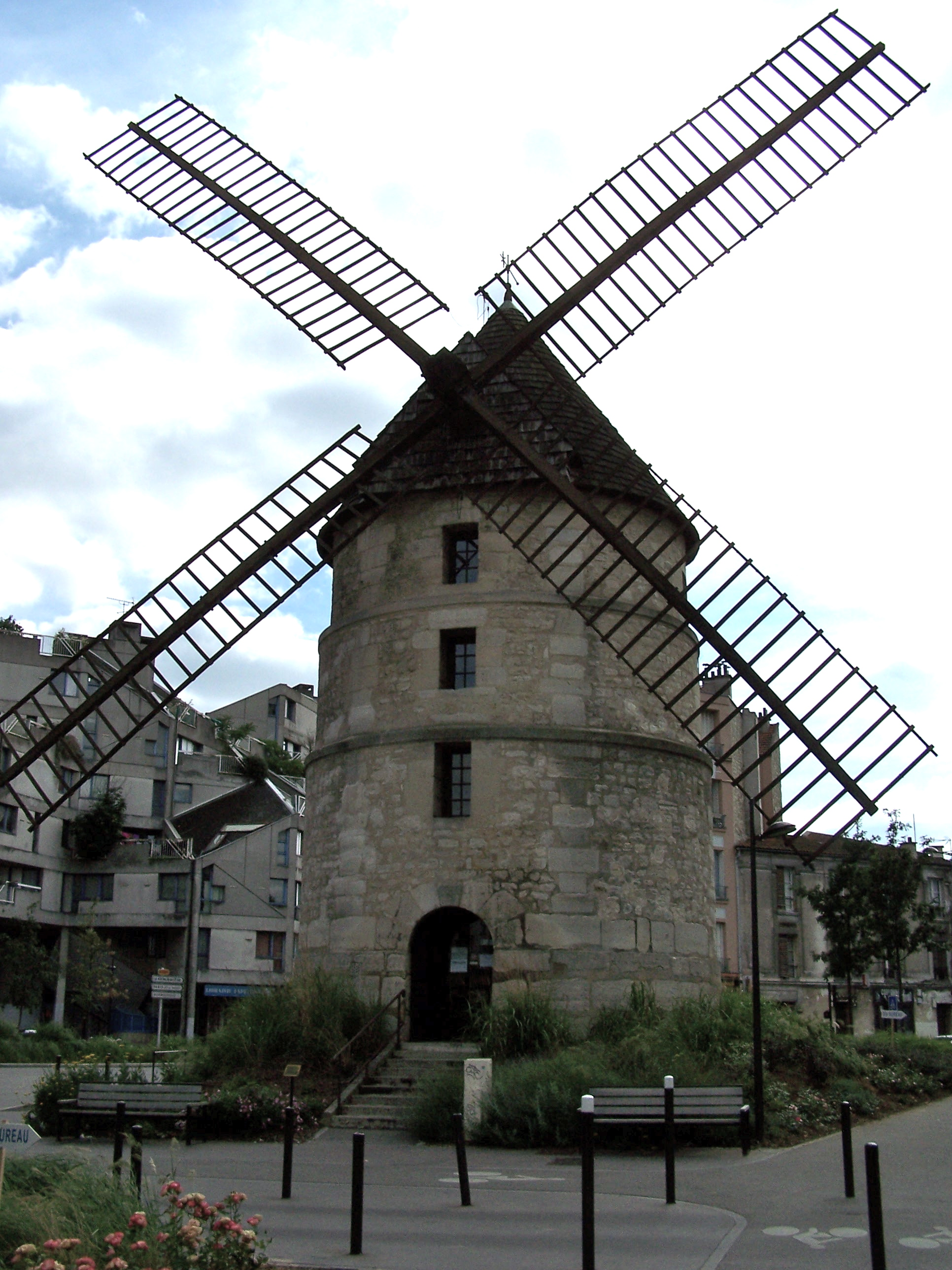

- Location within Paris and inner ring
- 48°49′04″N 2°22′25″E
- Type: Windmill
- Location: Ivry-sur-Seine, Val-de-Marne, France

History
- Built: 17th century

Site notes
- Owner: Commune of Ivry-sur-Seine

Monument historique
- Official name: Moulin à vent (ancien)
- Criteria: Inscrit MH
- Reference no.: PA00079881

The Moulin de la Tour is a windmill located in Ivry-sur-Seine, Val-de-Marne, France. It is listed as a Historic Monument.

== History ==
The mill, built in the 17th century, was located in the fiefdom of Ivry and Saint-Frambourg. It was operational until the early 19th century.

It was mentioned in an act of attribution in 1680, then on the Royal hunting map in 1765, when it was sold to miller Charles Mortier.

The building was subsequently used as a warehouse. It was dilapidated and lost its wings, so it was threatened with demolition.

In 1975, the mill was saved from an urban planning project by the city council of Ivry-sur-Seine and an association. On May 6, 1976, it was moved 35 meters away on hydraulic jacks and two parallel narrow-gauge railway tracks. It was restored by the city council and opened to visitors.

It is the only surviving windmill in Val-de-Marne, and was listed a Class Historic Monument in 1979.
