= Eka Skhiladze =

Georgian women's rights activist

Ekaterine Skhiladze, also known as Eka Skhiladze, is a Georgian women's rights activist.

== Life and activism ==
Skhiladze studied law at Ivane Javakhishvili Tbilisi State University.

From 2007 until 2012, Skhiladze worked at Women's Information Center, an NGO focused on women's health. Beginning in 2009, Skhiladze became involved in public diplomacy projects regarding Georgian relations with Abkhazian and Ossetian communities.

From 2013–2016, Skhliadze served as Head of the Department of Gender Equality at the Public Defender's Office of Georgia. In July 2016, she was appointed Deputy Public Defender of Georgia, a position which she held until 2023. In the position, she advocated for policies to lessen social inequality between men and women, lower femicide rates, and to otherwise eliminate violence against women and girls. She also spoke on the need to protect children's safety in schools, and the need for closer government oversight of religious boarding schools. Skhiladze also held the position of Head of the Gender Equality Department of the Public Defender's Office.

In 2016, she was given the Kato Mikeladze Award.
