= Alla O. Starostina =

Ukrainian economist

- Старостіна Алла Олексіївна
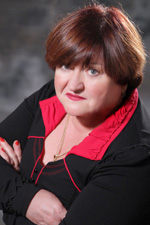
- Awards: Excellence in Education of Ukraine Badge; State Prize of Ukraine in Science and Technology; Honored Scientist of Ukraine

Academic background
- Education: Taras Shevchenko National University of Kyiv

Alla Oleksiivna Starostina (Ukrainian: Старостіна Алла Олексіївна) is a Ukrainian economist. She is a professor and heads the international economics and marketing department at Taras Shevchenko National University of Kyiv. Starostina was the head of the industrial marketing department at National Technical University of Ukraine from 1993 to 2002.

Starostina graduated from Taras Shevchenko National University of Kyiv in 1976 with a degree in the political economy. In 1999, she defended her dissertation, Методологія і практика маркетингових досліджень в Україні (transl. Methodology and practice of marketing research in Ukraine).

Starostina is a recipient of the Excellence in Education of Ukraine Badge. She received the State Prize of Ukraine in Science and Technology in 2011 for her marketing textbooks. She was named an Honored Scientist of Ukraine in 2009.
