= Agricultural University of Georgia =

Private university in Tbilisi, Georgia

- საქართველოს აგრარული უნივერსიტეტი
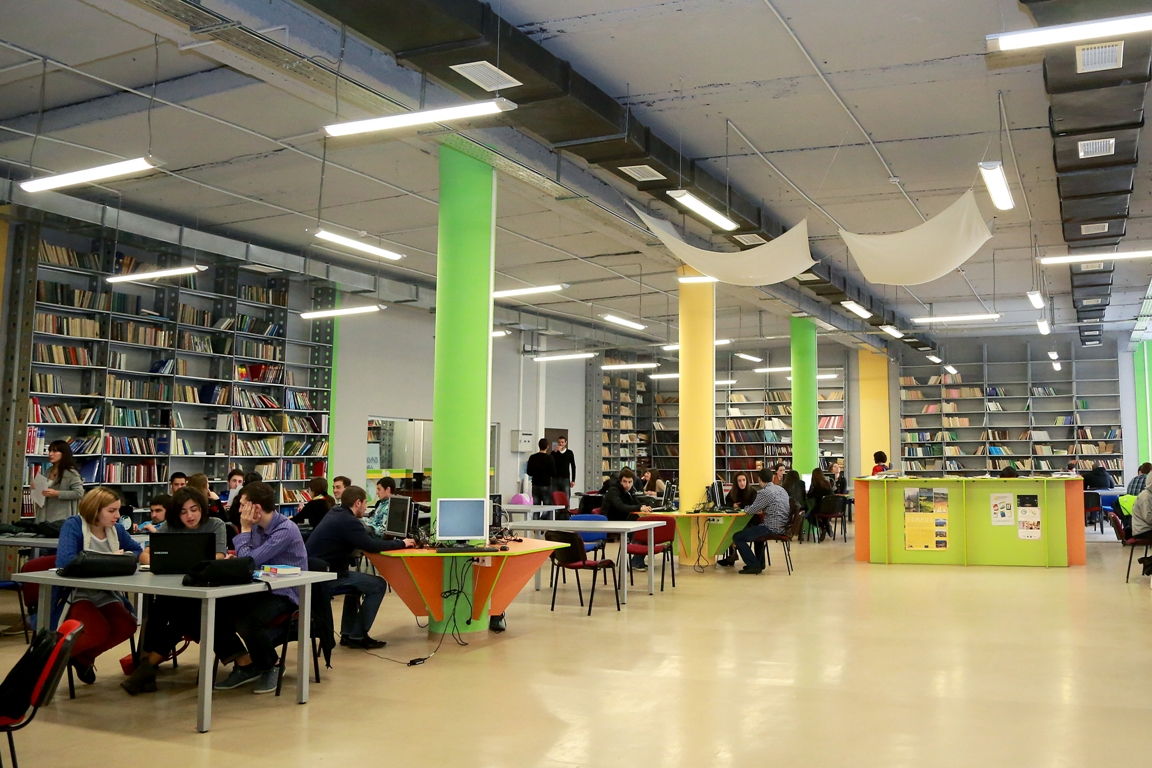
- Free University of Tbilisi Library
- Motto: Scientia, Labor, Libertas
- Type: Non-Profit; Private
- Established: 1929; 97 years ago
- Rector: Vakhtang Lejava
- Location: Tbilisi, Georgia; 41.8056°N 44.7682°E
- Language: Georgian
- Website: http://agruni.edu.ge/ge

The Agricultural University of Georgia (Georgian: საქართველოს აგრარული უნივერსიტეტი, romanized: sakartvelos agraruli universit'et'i, AUG) is a non-profit, private, higher education institution located in the suburban setting of the large city of Tbilisi, Georgia. It is located in Davit Aghmashenebeli Alley #240. It was established in 1929, and is officially recognized by the National Center for Educational Quality Enhancement. It is a small university with an enrollment range of only 4,000 to 4,999 students.

AUG offers courses and programs that lead to bachelor's degrees, master's degrees, and doctorate degrees in several areas of study. The H.E. institution has a selective admission policy based on entrance examinations, with an admission rate of 50–60%, making it an averagely selective institution.

== Influence of Kakha Bendukidze ==
It is thanks to Kakha Bendukidze that the Agricultural University of Georgia is what it is today. After retiring from the public service, he decided to focus on tertiary education in Georgia, through the Knowledge Fund – a non-profit, charitable organization, and supported the Free University of Tbilisi and Agricultural University of Georgia. Between 2007 and 2012 Bendukidze had invested over US$50 million to the Knowledge Fund – an unprecedented volume of private investment in tertiary education in Georgia.

== Three faculties ==
AUG consists of three united schools: Schools of Agricultural and Natural Sciences, Engineering-Technological School, and School of Business Administration. Each school has its own Dean, with Theo Urushadze as the Dean of the School of Agricultural and Natural Sciences, Zaza Metreveli as the Dean of the Engineering-Technological School, and Giga Bedineishvili as the Dean of the School of Agricultural and Natural Sciences. Each School also has different prices.

== Programs and amenities ==
The university provides several academic and non-academic facilities and services to students, such as a library, housing, 20 technically equipped laboratories, 50 modern scientific laboratories, a cafeteria, a sports center (for basketball, volleyball, wrestling, and mini-football), a handball hall, a gymnastics studio, a theater, and recreation zones. AUG also offers financial aids and/or scholarships, study abroad and exchange programs, as well as administrative services. Wireless Internet access is available throughout the university.

=== Alumni ===
- Nato Shavlakadze - human rights activist

=== Exchange programs ===
AUG is partnered with 13 universities in Europe, America and Asia, allowing students to participate in exchange programs.
