= Free University of Tbilisi =

Private university in Tbilisi, Georgia

Coordinates: 41.8057275°N 44.7657262°E

Free University of Tbilisi თავისუფალი უნივერსიტეტი
- Seal of the Free University of Tbilisi
- Motto: Scientia, Labor, Libertas (Latin)
- Motto in English: Science, Labour, Liberty
- Type: Private
- Established: 2007; 19 years ago
- Parent institution: Knowledge Fund
- Chancellor: Aleksandre Kacharava
- Rector: Vakhtang Lejava
- Founder: Kakha Bendukidze
- Location: Tbilisi, Georgia
- Campus: Kakha Bendukidze University Campus, David Aghmashenebeli Alley № 240
- Director of the Knowledge Fund: Anastasia Bendukidze
- Colors
- Website: freeuni.edu.ge/en

Free University (Georgian: თავისუფალი უნივერსიტეტი, romanized: tavisupali universit'et'i) is a private research university in Tbilisi, Georgia, founded by Kakha Bendukidze, Georgian statesman, businessman and philanthropist often regarded as the Man Who Remade Georgia. Founded in 2007, the university has grown to comprise seven undergraduate and graduate schools, among which are, the university's oldest, School of International Relations, School of Business, Architecture, Governance and Social Sciences, Mathematics and Computer Science, Physics, Electrical and Computer Engineering, Law, and School of Visual Arts and Design.

The main goal of Kakha Bendukidze, FreeUni's founder, was to provide opportunities for a quality education to every motivated person in Georgia, regardless of their financial conditions. Benudkidze believed that clarity of purpose and the future were essential to any human endeavour.

The Free University is organized into seven constituent schools: the School of International Relations (Institute of Asia and Africa), the university's oldest, as well as the Schools of Business, Law, Physics, Computer Sciences & Math, Visual Arts & Design, and Governance & Social Sciences. While the Free University is governed by a combination of its Board of Overseers and the Knowledge Foundation, each school's faculty oversees its respective curriculum and degree programs. In addition to a central campus shared with the Agricultural University of Georgia in downtown Tbilisi, the University owns facilities all around Georgia, including the Anaseuli Education Center.

The current Rector of The Free University is Vakhtang Lezhava. There are 56 full-time and 84 part-time lecturers. 44 hold PhDs; 25 are PhD students. The programs are run on a daily basis by deans and academic coordinators.

== Kakha Bendukidze ==
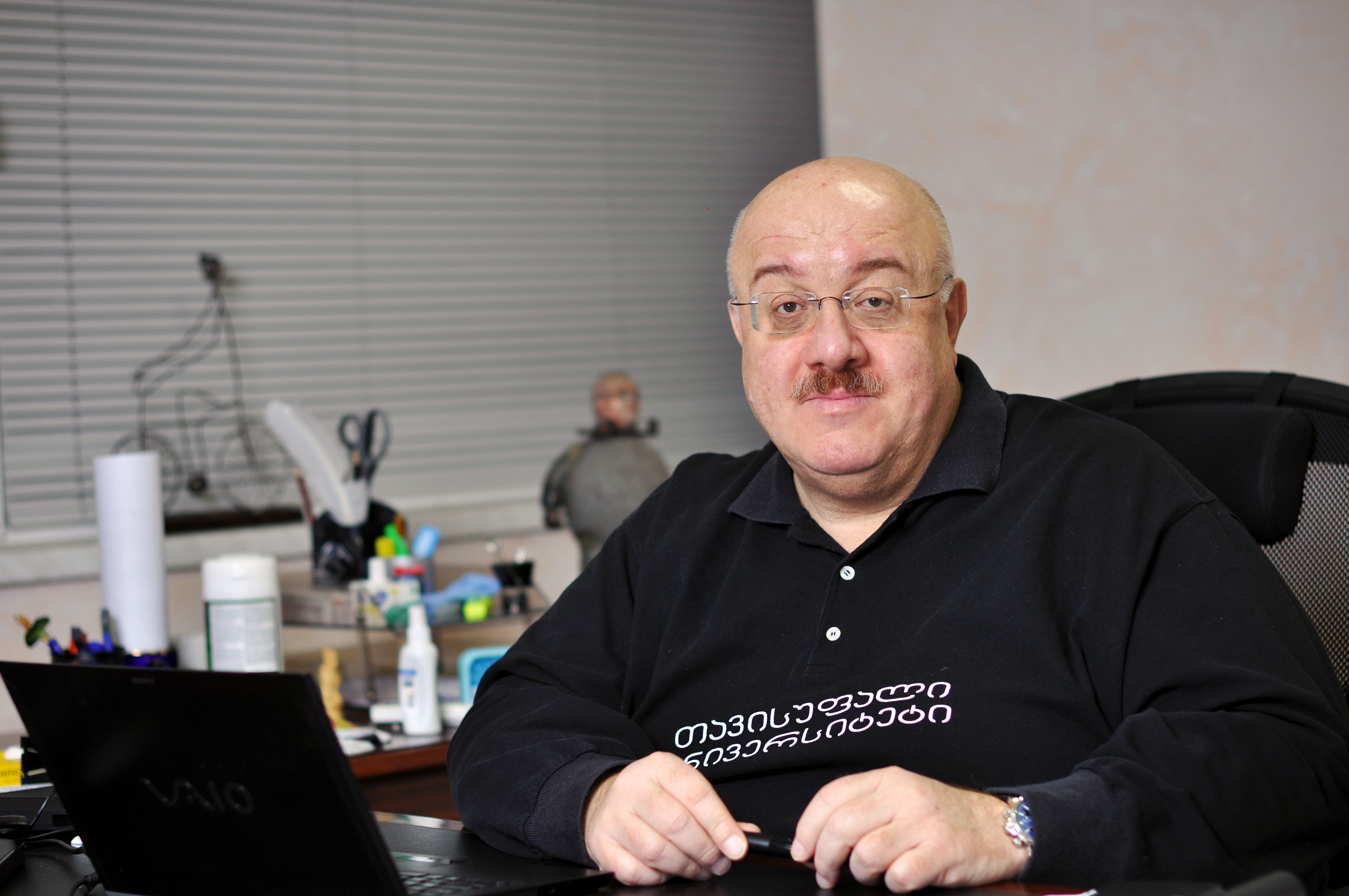
Kakha Bendukidze.

The Free University was founded by Kakha Bendukidze (Georgian: კახა ბენდუქიძე; 20 April 1956 – 13 November 2014), Georgian statesman, businessman and philanthropist. The main aim of Kakha Bendukidze was providing opportunities for a quality education for every motivated adult, regardless of financial conditions, was the goal of Kakha Bendukidze. He made unprecedented investments in education in Georgia. Since the foundation of the Knowledge Foundation and head of the united supervisory board of Agricultural and Free Universities.

A biologist by education, Bendukidze started his own business, Bioprocess, which manufactured biochemicals for scientific research in 1987. Soon he became known as one of Russia's leading libertarians. He led a working group on tax and currency within the Russian Union of Industrialists and Entrepreneurs and pressed for changes in tax policy, which ultimately included adoption of a flat 13 percent tax rate. In Russia, he was a strong opponent of government intervention in the economy, a view that put him at odds with President Vladimir Putin. Soon Bendukidze sold his stake and moved back to Georgia.

After the Rose Revolution, shortly after returning from Russia, he was appointed as Minister of Economy by former President Mikheil Saakashvili and the late Prime Minister Zurab Jvania in 2004. He served as Georgian Minister of Economy (June–December 2004), Minister for Reform Coordination (December 2004 – January 2008) and Head of the Chancellery of Government of Georgia (February 2008 – February 2009) and was the author of liberal reforms that overhauled Georgia's post-Soviet economy.

The appointment of Bendukidze and his service as the Minister of Economics gave Georgia a yearly 9.3% economic growth in 2004–2007 and almost four times more foreign investments. The government managed to decrease the taxes fourfold, the number of licenses by 90% and liberalize the labour market. These liberal steps were what led to the formation of the previously almost non-existent middle class.

He created a charity called the Knowledge Foundation, and he was the force behind the establishment of the Free University of Tbilisi and the Agricultural University of Georgia.

== Faculties ==
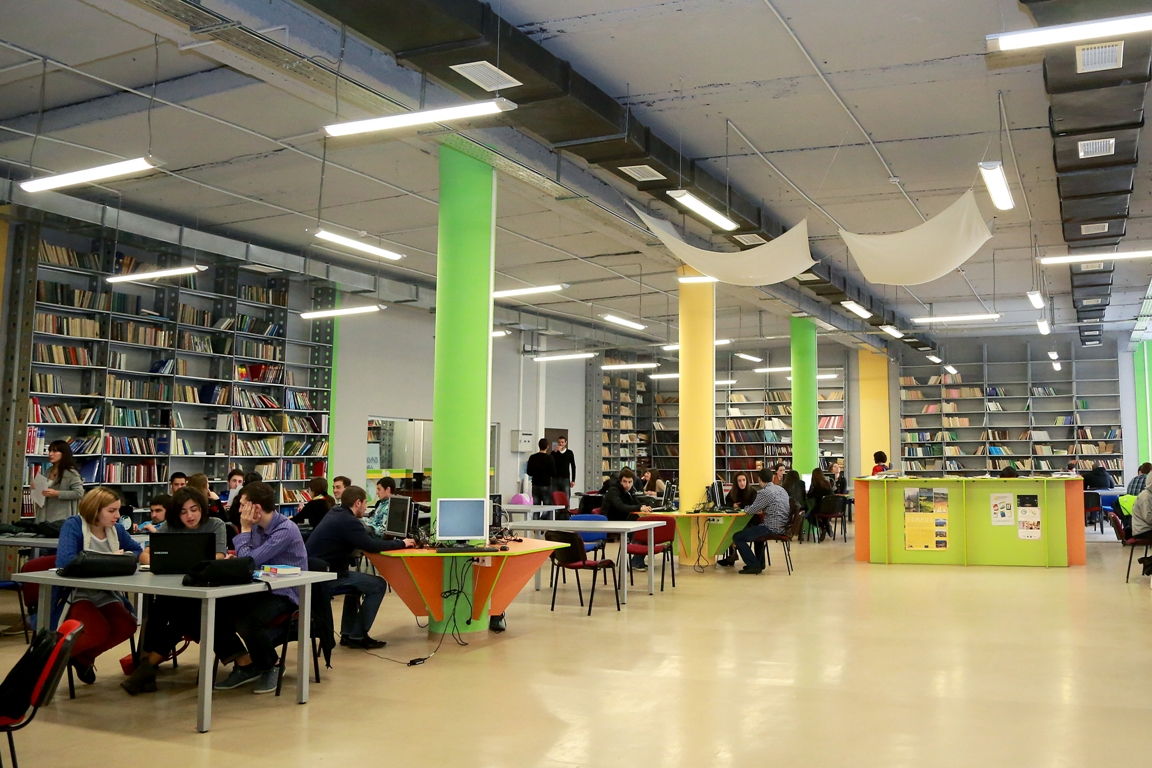
Library of the university.

The School of International Relations - the oldest School at the University - began as the Institute of Asia and Africa in 1991 and retains a special emphasis on cultures and politics. In the past, that has meant extensive offerings on the cultures and languages of the Near, Middle East, and Far East. Now the program also offers European and the US studies.

The program in international relations prepares students for careers in diplomacy, foreign policy, defence, national security, international organizations, international business, and education. Apart from the broad range of courses in international diplomacy, political theory, law, and economics. The curriculum provides knowledge in literature, culture, religion and history with a choice of specialization in one language.

The Business School began as the independent European School of Management and for more than 20 years has been the leader of business education in Georgia. The program includes a rich variety of courses at both undergraduate and graduate (MA) levels, such as: management, marketing, accounting and finance, business studies, operations management, business in action, etc. The principal defining feature of the program is teaching business in action. This ensures breadth and generality and encourages flexibility, creativity, and entrepreneurship.

The Computer Science and Mathematics (MACS) program offers a bachelor's degree with two concentrations, one in mathematics and the other on computer science. Students choose one of the concentrations to better focus their education in that particular direction. The MACS program has the highest-performing students in Georgia according to their performance on the Georgian Unified National Examinations. For example, the top seven scorers on the 2014 Exam are currently enrolled in the MACS program.

The undergraduate program in Governance and Social Sciences offers liberal arts education covering the social sciences and humanities. Students gain knowledge in the fields of philosophy, anthropology, sociology, psychology, history, art, and literature. A top priority is to encourage independent thought and critical analysis. Students work closely with classic texts and engage in heated discussions and debates, engage in studies in different fields. Additionally, students take courses in business, economy, law, and project management to further prepare them for career development and future leadership in government, commercial and non-government organizations, and the media.

The four-year undergraduate program in Physics provides a solid foundation leading to a B.S. degree in Physics. The program exposes students to both traditional and cutting-edge areas of physics: astrophysics and general relativity, condensed-matter physics, and particle physics. The degree provides a sound basis either for entering graduate school or for pursuing a variety of careers in various sectors.
