= Kakha Bendukidze =

Georgian statesman, businessman and philanthropist (1956–2014)

- კახა ბენდუქიძე
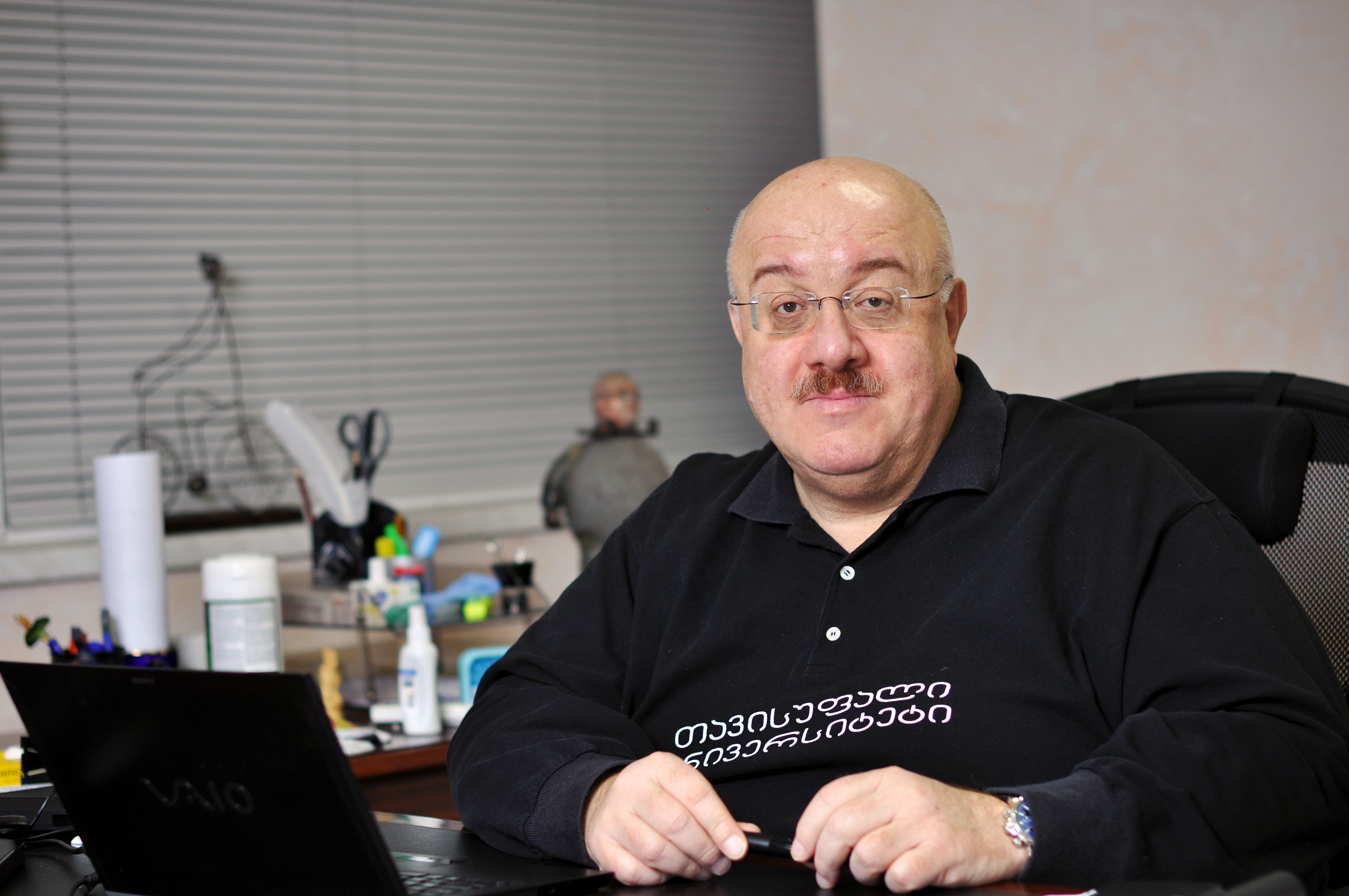
- Bendukidze in 2012

Minister of Economy and Sustainable Development
- In office 1 June 2004 – 14 December 2004
- President: Mikheil Saakashvili
- Succeeded by: Lekso Aleksishvili

Ministry of Economical Reforms Coordination
- In office 14 December 2004 – 24 January 2008
- President: Mikheil Saakashvili

Head of Chancellery of the Government of Georgia
- In office January 2008 – February 2009

Personal details
- Born: 20 April 1956 Tbilisi, Georgian SSR, USSR
- Died: 13 November 2014 (aged 58) London, United Kingdom
- Spouse: Natalia Zolotova
- Children: Anastasia Goncharova
- Website: http://kakhabendukidze.com/

Kakha Bendukidze (Georgian: კახა ბენდუქიძე; 20 April 1956 – 13 November 2014) was a Georgian statesman, businessman and philanthropist, founder of the Knowledge Foundation and head of the supervisory board of Agricultural and Free Universities.

A biologist by education, Bendukidze started his own business, Bioprocess, which manufactured biochemicals for scientific research in 1987. Soon he became known as one of Russia's leading libertarians. He led a working group on tax and currency within the Russian Union of Industrialists and Entrepreneurs and pressed for changes in tax policy, which ultimately included adoption of a flat 13 percent tax rate. In Russia, he was a strong opponent of government intervention in the economy, a view that put him at odds with President Vladimir Putin. Soon Bendukidze sold his stake and moved back to Georgia.

After the Rose Revolution, shortly after returning from Russia, he was appointed as Minister of Economy by former President Mikheil Saakashvili and the late Prime Minister Zurab Jvania in 2004. He served as Georgian Minister of Economy (June–December 2004), Minister for Reform Coordination (December 2004 – January 2008) and Head of the Chancellery of Government of Georgia (February 2008 – February 2009). Bendukidze oversaw liberal reforms that overhauled Georgia's post-Soviet economy. Consequently, he became regarded by many as the Man Who Remade Georgia.

After the appointment of Bendukidze, Georgia experienced a yearly 9.3% economic growth in 2004–2007 and almost four times more foreign investments. The government managed to decrease the taxes fourfold, the number of licenses by 90% and to liberalize the labour market.

He created a charity called the Knowledge Foundation, and he was the force behind the establishment of the Free University of Tbilisi and the Agricultural University of Georgia.

Bendukidze took an active role in helping the new government of Ukraine during its confrontation with Russia in 2014.

== Early life ==
Bendukidze was born in Tbilisi, USSR, and graduated from the Department of Biology of Tbilisi State University in 1977 and from the Postgraduate School of the Moscow State University in 1980. From 1981 to 1985, he worked for the Institute of Biology and Physiology of Micro-organisms in Puschino. From 1985 to 1988, he worked as the head of the Laboratory for Molecular Genetics at the Institute of Biotechnology.

== Personal life ==
Bendukidze has a daughter – Anastasia Goncharova (1990– ) – who adopted the surname of her mother. She took over the Knowledge Fund management from 2016, and married Ivan Mkheidze in 2017 . In March 1999, Bendukidze married Natalia Zolotova, who has 2 sons from the previous marriage; her first husband died., however the couple lived separately after 2004, since Kakha Bendukidze returned to Georgia.

== Businessman in Russia ==
With the onset of Perestroika, Bendukidze created a small business called Bioprocess. In 1993, during the Voucher Privatization, campaign he bought stock in Uralmash. Bendukidze became a board member and later, Director-General of this company. After merging Uralmash with Izhora Plants in 1996, Bendukidze became chairman and CEO (Director-General) of the merged company, Objedinennie Mashinostroitelnie Zavody (OMZ). Under Bendukidze, OMZ became one of Russia's largest heavy engineering companies and he was one of the top twenty business leaders with an influential voice on economic policy.

By 2004 the Russian government under President Vladimir Putin had tightened its grip on strategic industries. According to Boris Berezovsky: "Bendukidze does not belong to Putin's circle of friends and he understood sooner than everyone else that everything would be taken away from him... Bendukidze by far hasn't exhausted his potential but right now the Russian authorities do not need such talented people". Thus, he decided to move to his native Georgia. In March 2004, he left the position of Chairman of OMZ and later sold his interest in the company. On 2 June 2004, he became Georgia's Economics Minister.

== Georgian public figure ==
Bendukidze returned to Georgia after the Rose Revolution victory, having been appointed Minister of Economy in the new Saakashvili cabinet. Since 14 December 2004 to 31 January 2008, he was State Minister for Reform Co-ordination, coordinating government efforts to liberalize the economy.

The Economist said of Bendukidze: "Mr Bendukidze made his name and fortune as an industrialist in neighboring Russia, putting together the country's biggest heavy-engineering group, OMZ, before returning to his native Georgia in June of this year with a mandate to reverse more than a decade of post-Soviet decay. He insists that he was taken by surprise when Georgia's president, Mikhail Saakashvili, and Prime Minister, Zurab Zhvania, nobbled him for a chat in the course of a private visit he made to Tbilisi in May, and then offered him a ministerial job the same evening. But having said yes, he is cracking ahead, doing everything that businessmen must dream of making governments do. He says that Georgia should be ready to sell 'everything that can be sold, except its conscience, and that is just the start.'"

He was known as a committed libertarian and strong supporter of market economy, deregulation and privatization, stating that the Georgian government should sell everything except its honor. During 2004–2007, under his leadership, Georgia became the top-reforming country in the world, according to the World Bank's Ease of doing business index report. In particular, Georgia jumped from 137th to 11th on the ease of doing business scale, ahead of Germany and France. During this time, he worked closely with Simeon Djankov and Leszek Balcerowicz on the design of customs and tax administrations' reforms, as well as on opening up visa-free travel.

Bendukidze was pivotal in the libertarian reforms launched under Saakashvili, including one of the least restrictive labour codes, the lowest flat income tax rates (12%) and some of the lowest customs rates worldwide, along with the drastic reduction of licenses and permits for business. The reform experience is summarized in a book published by the Peterson Institute on The Most Radical Catch-Up Reforms.

In the January 2008 cabinet reshuffle, Bendukidze became Head of the State Chancellery. During his tenure, he was considered one of the most influential Georgian politicians, although he was not popular amongst opposition in the administration. He was criticized for repealing anti-monopoly legislation and introducing a liberal labor code. The opposition accused him of trying to sell off each of Georgia's strategic assets; such as sea ports, entire railway system, gas supply network, forests, etc.

In February 2009 Bendukidze retired from the public service to focus on tertiary education in Georgia, through the Knowledge Fund – a non-profit, charitable organization, founded by Bendukidze in 2007 to set up and support the Free University of Tbilisi and Agricultural University of Georgia. Between 2007 and 2012 Bendukidze had invested over US$50 million to the Knowledge Fund – an unprecedented volume of private investment in tertiary education in Georgia.

== Ukrainian public figure ==
In September 2014 the President of Ukraine Petro Poroshenko created the National Reforms Council to support state reforms and strategic development process. Kakha Bendukidze acts as a member of National Reforms Council 's advisory board along with the leading reformers of Northern and Central European countries: Valdis Dombrovskis – former Prime Minister of Latvia, Leszek Balcerowicz – former Deputy Prime Minister and Finance Minister of Poland and Ivan Mikloš – former Finance Minister of Slovakia. The main task of the advisory board is to provide efficient proposals on the implementation of reforms in Ukraine based on the international experience. Advisory board closely cooperates with the executive board of the Council which includes Prime Minister of Ukraine, Speaker of the Parliament and the Head of the National Bank.

Somewhat earlier, in May 2014 Bendukidze also accepted the invitation of the President of Ukraine to become a member of the Economic Advisory Council. In an interview shortly after his appointment, Bendukidze said that Ukraine "has to take courageous steps to transform the economy." Proposed reforms included changes in tax system and a tough fight against corruption.

After the death of Bendukidze, Petro Poroshenko expressed his condolences.

== Death ==
Bendukidze died on the 13 November 2014 in the InterContinental Hotel on Park Lane in London, after undergoing a stent heart surgery in Zurich a week prior. The former president of Georgia Mikhail Saakashvili had expressed interest for Bendukidze to be buried on Mtatsminda in Tbilisi, in the Pantheon of public figures and writers of Georgia, but the wish of the family was that Bendukidze be buried next to his mother's grave in the Kukia Cemetery in Tbilisi.

== Quotes ==
- Regarding Georgia's mixed democratic progress, he often used to say: "Georgia made a step forward in terms of democracy, but sometimes when you make a step forward you step in shit."
- "Anything can be put up for sale, except one's conscience."
