= Natia Mezvrishvili =

Georgian lawyer and politician

- ნათია მეზვრიშვილი

Member of the Parliament of Georgia
- In office 2024–2025

Personal details
- Party: For Georgia (since 2021)
- Other political affiliations: Independent (formerly)
- Education: Tbilisi State University University of Cincinnati (LL.M.)
- Profession: Lawyer, Politician

Natia Mezvrishvili (Georgian: ნათია მეზვრიშვილი) is a Georgian lawyer and politician. She was elected a member of the Parliament of Georgia in 2024, representing the opposition party For Georgia. Prior to her election, she held several high-level government positions, including Head of the Government Administration of Georgia and Deputy Minister of Internal Affairs.

== Early life and education ==
Natia Mezvrishvili grew up in the Georgian Soviet Socialist Republic. She pursued a legal career, graduating from the Faculty of Law at Tbilisi State University. She later earned a Master of Laws (LL.M.) degree from the University of Cincinnati College of Law in the United States in 2017 as a Fulbright Scholar.

== Career ==
Mezvrishvili worked in the Office of the Prosecutor General of Georgia, rising to leadership roles where she was involved in reforming legal procedures. She also worked as a Lecturer at Tbilisi State University and as a professor of criminal law. After returning from her LL.M. studies, she was appointed Deputy Minister of Internal Affairs.

In October 2019, Mezvrishvili was appointed Head of the Government Administration of Georgia, serving as the Chief of Staff to the Prime Minister. She resigned from this position in November 2020. In late May 2021, she was among the first members to join the newly formed For Georgia party, led by former Prime Minister Giorgi Gakharia. The party positioned itself as a centrist alternative to the two main political rivals. She was elected as a Member of Parliament in the 2024 parliamentary elections, but didn't take up her seat as part of the opposition boycott. Her mandate was terminated by the Georgian Dream controlled parliament on 2 July 2025, together with the rest of the For Georgia faction due to their permanent absence.
