= Alla Parunova =

Georgian feminist

- Born: Varketili, Tbilisi
- Education: Tbilisi State University
- Awards: Kato Mikeladze Award (2023)

Alla Parunova (Georgian: ალა პარუნოვა; born 1989 or 1990) is a Georgian feminist and queer activist.

Parunova received the Kato Mikeladze Award in 2023.

== Activism ==
Parunova became interested in feminism while working at a library. She was particularly inspired by one book she read, Elfriede Jelinek's novel Women as Lovers, which kickstarted her feminist analysis of her life experiences. She then began a gender studies master's degree, during which she also realized how she was oppressed due to her queer and ethnic Armenian identities. Her master's thesis explored "dominant discourses on sexuality" during the Brezhnev Era of the Soviet Union.

Parunova became a member of the Georgian Young Greens in 2015, and remained a member for 6–7 years, during which she became involved with feminist and environmental activism.

== Early and personal life ==
Parunova was born in Varketili, Tbilisi, where she was raised by an Armenian-speaking family. She then studied Georgian and later, Russian, in school. As a child, she felt isolated from Georgian society, and has spoken on her experiences of assimilation. She graduated from Tbilisi State University in 2012 with a bachelor's degree in English Language and Literature.

Parunova speaks four languages. She is queer, and described her sexuality as "inclusive, diverse, and...in the process of constant analysis".
