= Alla Ilchun =

Kazakh fashion model

- Born: 1926; Harbin, Republic of China
- Died: 8 March 1989 (aged 62–63); Paris, France
- Occupation: model
- Spouses: Mike de Dülmen; Igor Mukhin
- Children: 1
- Parent(s): Kuantkhan (Zhuanhan) Ilchun; Tamara Ilchun

Alla Ilchun (10 December 1926 – 6 March 1989) was a China-born Kazakhfashion model who lived in France. A muse for Christian Dior, who referred to her as "his personal talisman", she was the first prominent Asian woman to model European fashions.

== Biography ==
Ilchun was born in Harbin, China in 1926. Her father, Kuantkhan Ilchun, was a railway engineer from a wealthy family in Kazakhstan. Her mother, Tamara, was a Russian opera singer and the daughter of a White Army officer. Due to political unrest in Harbin, with the city passing between the Chinese and the Japanese, the Ilchun family fled to France. Her father was apprehended and sent to Tokyo.

As a teenager, Ilchun worked as a dishwasher in a Parisian restaurant. During World War II, she joined the French Resistance.

Ilchun attended a model casting in Paris, as a favor to a friend, and was chosen by Christian Dior to work for the fashion house. She became a highly successful model, and a muse for Dior, who referred to her as "his personal talisman". She was the first Asian model in the European fashion world.

While working as a model, she met photographer Mike de Dülmen. The two married and had one child.

After Dior's death, Ilchun worked closely with Yves Saint Laurent.

== Legacy ==
In 2020, a documentary film titled Alla – Dior’s Oriental Pearl was released by Berlin Irishev, president of AKF.
