= Order of Honor (Georgia) =

Award in Georgia

Order of Honor ღირსების ორდენი
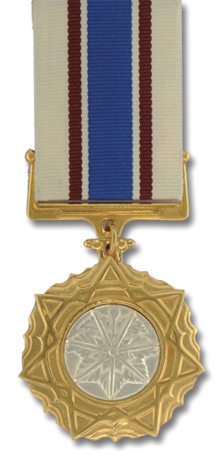
- Order of Honor

Awarded by Georgia
- Type: Single grade order
- Established: December 24, 1992

Precedence
- Next (higher): Vakhtang Gorgasali Order
- Next (lower): Civic Dedication Medal
- Ribbon bar

The Order of Honor (Georgian: ღირსების ორდენი, romanized: ghirsebis ordeni) is an honor awarded by the president of Georgia. Established in 1992, the Order of Honor is awarded to a person in the construction of the state of Georgia - in the development of governance, defense, law and order, economy, health, culture, education, science, art or literature - for outstanding contribution, sporting achievement, heroism and devotion.

== Insignia ==
The Order of Merit has a round shape 38 millimeters in diameter. A seven-pointed braided golden star rests on a silver field composed of circular layered morcal shapes. In the middle of the braid, which is 20 millimeters in diameter, is a golden vine leaf with a seven-pointed silver Asterisk-like figure. Among the star gills are six silver grains in the shape of a grape seed.

The stalk of the order is movably attached to a bracket with a 28 mm wide band. There is a wide blue stripe in the middle of the white background of the band. On both sides of the blue stripe are 2 mm wide red stripes.

The author of the Order of Honor is a graphic artist, artist-monumentalist Emir Burjanadze.

== See also ==
- Orders, decorations, and medals of Georgia
