= Boris Yeltsin Street =

Street in Yekaterinburg, Russia

Coordinates: 56°50′40″N 60°35′25″E

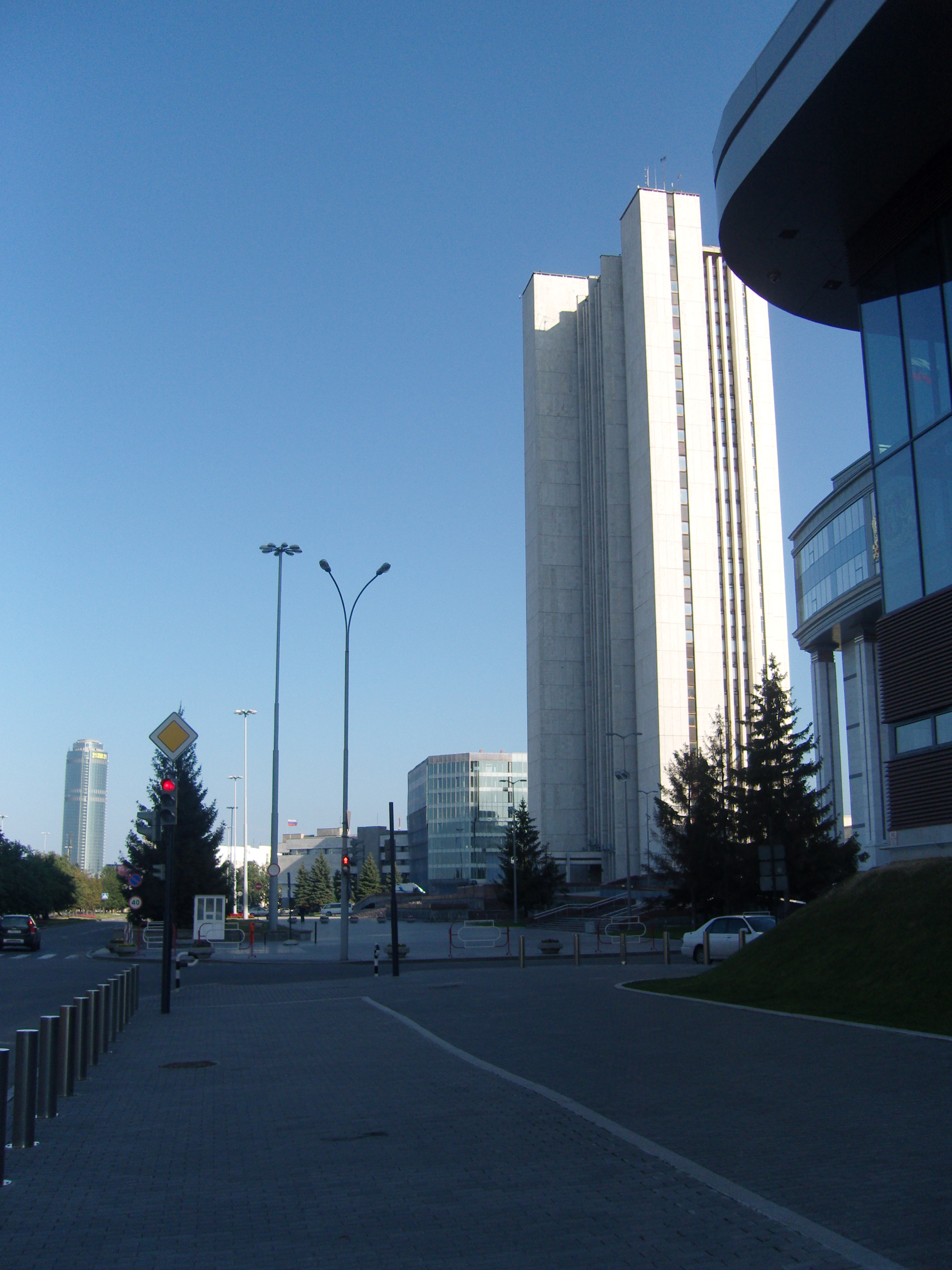
- Native name: улица Бориса Ельцина (Russian)
- Length: 0.84 km (0.52 mi)
- Location: Sverdlovsk Oblast, Russia; Yekaterinburg; Verkh-Isetsky District; Downtown
- Nearest metro station: Ploshchad 1905 Goda; Dinamo

Boris Yeltsin Street (Russian: Улица Бориса Ельцина, IPA: [ˈulʲɪt͡sə bɐˈrisə ˈjelʲtsɨnə]) is a street in Yekaterinburg, Russia.

== History ==
The street historically developed in the 1740s as one of the streets of Ssylnaya Sloboda ("settlement of the exiled"), emerging outside Zeley Gates of Yekaterinburg Fortress. Street direction reflected the line of the south side of the Yekaterinburg City Pond. On the city plan of 1810 it was marked as Ordinarnaya (Ordinary) Street, on the city plan of 1845 — Fetisovskaya (Fetisov).

Until 1845, Fetisovskaya street was quite developed, consisting of two long quarters. The street started from Metlinskaya (Metlin) Street (beginning of modern 8 Marta (8 March) Street) and approached Severnaya (North) Street. In 1919, the street was renamed Devyatogo Yanvarya (9 January) Street to commemorate the events of 9 January 1905 in Saint Petersburg.

On 8 April 2008, the street was renamed after the first president of Russia Yeltsin. On 1 February 2011, the Boris Yeltsin Monument was opened on the street near Demidov-Plaza business center.

== Notable locations ==
- No. 3 — Boris Yeltsin Presidential Center
- No. 6 — Iset Tower
- No. 10 — Legislative Assembly of Sverdlovsk Oblast

== See also ==
- Yekaterinburg-City

== Sources ==
- Зорина, Л. И. (Zorina L.I.), & Слукин, В. М. (Slukin V.M.) (2005). Улицы и площади старого Екатеринбурга (Streets and squares of old Yekaterinburg). Yekaterinburg, Russia: Basko.
- Рабинович, Р. И. (Rabinovich R.I.), & Шерстобитов, С. Л. (Shestobritov S.L.) (1965). Улицы Свердловска (Streets of Sverdlovsk) (2nd ed.). Sverdlovsk, USSR: Mid-Ural Books Publishing. http://www.1723.ru/read/books/sverdlovsk-1965.htm
- Худякова, М. Ф. (Khudiakova M.F.) (2003). Улицы Екатеринбурга (Streets of Yekaterinburg). Yekaterinburg, Russia: Mid-Ural Books Publishing.
