= Iset Tower =

- Башня «Исеть»
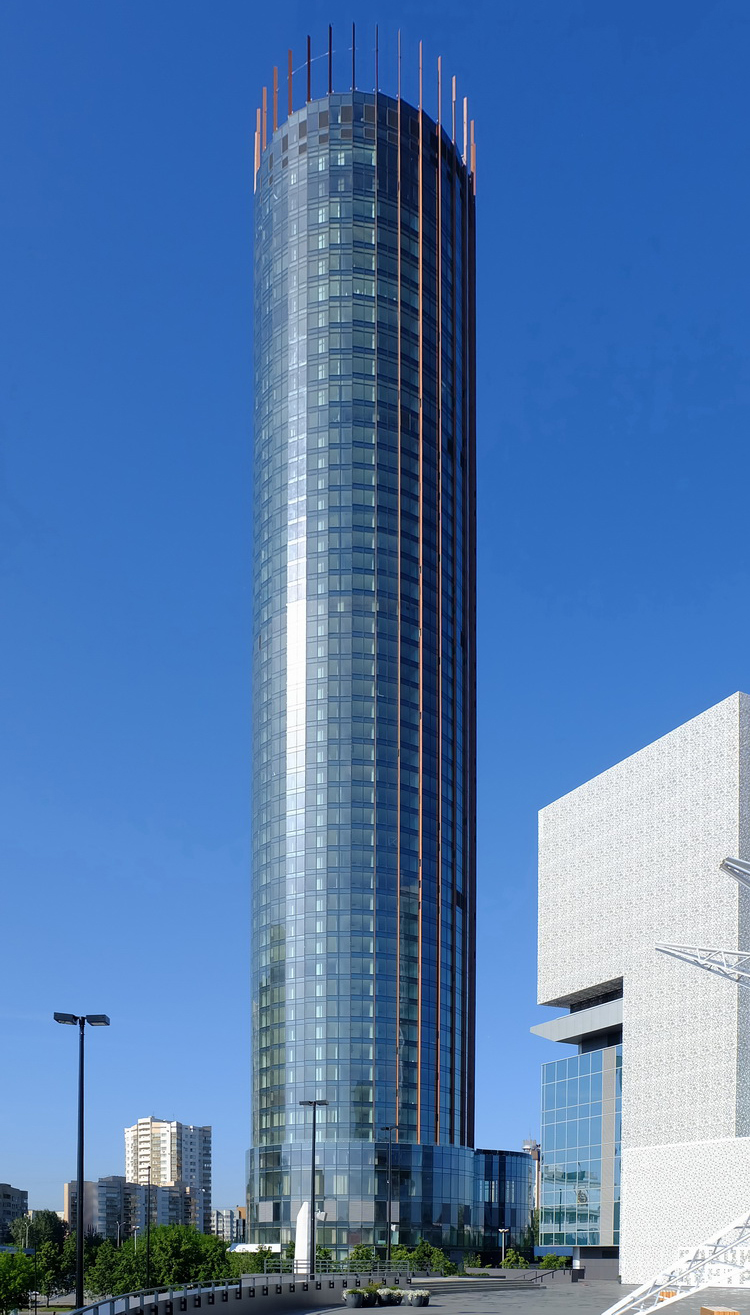
- Interactive map of the Iset Tower area

General information
- Status: Completed
- Type: Residential condominiums
- Architectural style: Structural Expressionism
- Location: Yekaterinburg-City, Yekaterinburg, Russia
- Coordinates: 56°50′36″N 60°35′26″E
- Construction started: 2010
- Completed: 2015
- Cost: US$ 230 million
- Owner: Ural Mining and Metallurgical Company

Height
- Roof: 209 m (686 ft)

Technical details
- Floor count: 52
- Floor area: 7,524 m^{2} (80,990 sq ft)
- Lifts/elevators: 6

Design and construction
- Architect: Werner Sobek
- Developer: UGMK

The Iset Tower (Russian: Башня Исеть) is a 52-story skyscraper in the Yekaterinburg-City business district of Yekaterinburg, Sverdlovsk Oblast. It is the tallest building in Yekaterinburg and the 16th tallest building in Russia, with a record height of 212.8 metres (698 ft). It was also the tallest building outside Moscow until it was surpassed by the Lakhta Center of Saint Petersburg. It became the tallest structure of Yekaterinburg on 24 March 2018 when the unfinished TV Tower nearby was demolished as part of the city’s beautification program in preparation for the 2018 FIFA World Cup.

Iset Tower is the second building of the commercial district Yekaterinburg-City and will settle down in the prestigious neighborhood with the house of the government of Sverdlovsk Oblast, the Regional Duma, drama theater and 5-star Hyatt Regency Yekaterinburg hotel across of B. Yeltsin St. and Boevih Druzhin.

The Iset Tower is named after the Iset River, which goes through central Yekaterinburg.

== History ==
The Iset Tower's design was competed by two European architecture companies, German engineer and architect Werner Sobek and the French architecture company Valode & Pistre Architectes. Eventually, Werner Sobek won the competition and their design was chosen. ₽12.8 billion rubles ($230 million US dollars) were invested in the construction of the skyscraper. UGMK Holdings developed the skyscraper later on.

Planning began in 2010 and ended in 2012. Construction began in 2010 and completed in 2015.

== Architecture ==
The Iset Tower has a total area of 80,983 sq ft (7,524 m^{2}), 52 stories above ground, 4 stories below ground, an architectural height of 209 m (685.70 ft) and a roof height of 197 m (646.33 ft). The Iset Tower is fitted with 225 premium class serviced apartments, as well as including a casino, club house, and parking. According to Werner Sobek, The Iset Tower offers modern-day amenities such as a spa and wellness area, a swimming pool and its own cinema. A large restaurant as well as a lounge and a variety of shops in the lower storeys will be open to all residents in the district. A parkland area that is also open to the general public is being created on top of a generously dimensioned roof that covers the driveway and the parking facilities of the tower.

Iset Tower's structural material is concrete with a facade material of glass and a curtain wall facade system.

The complex is vertically divided into three parts which visually distinguish three different types of the facade. The building was designed for the extremely cold weather; the designed external temperature is -35 °C. The façade is mainly unitized with the triple-glazed IGU on aluminum substructure.

== Gallery ==
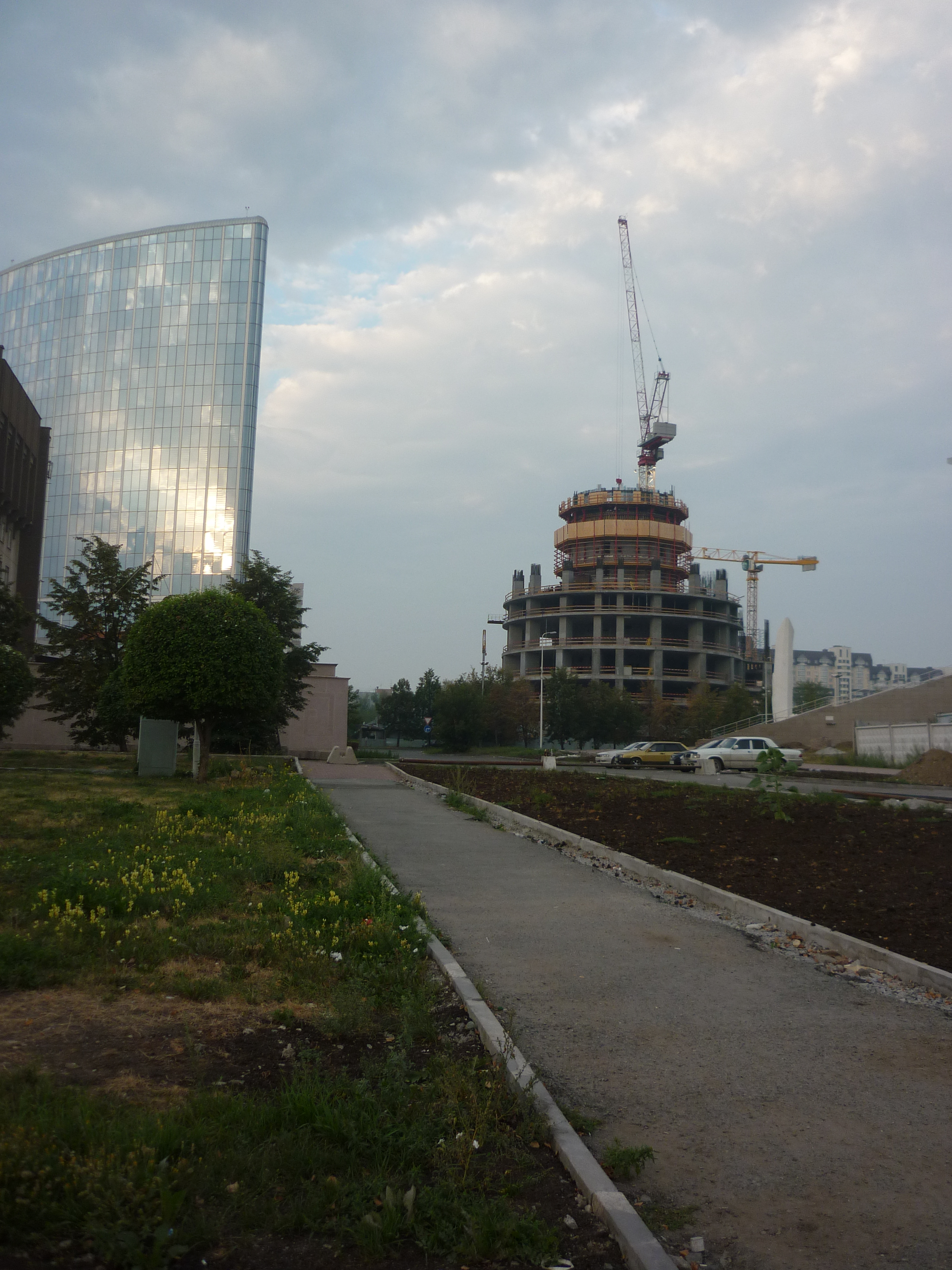
11 August 2012

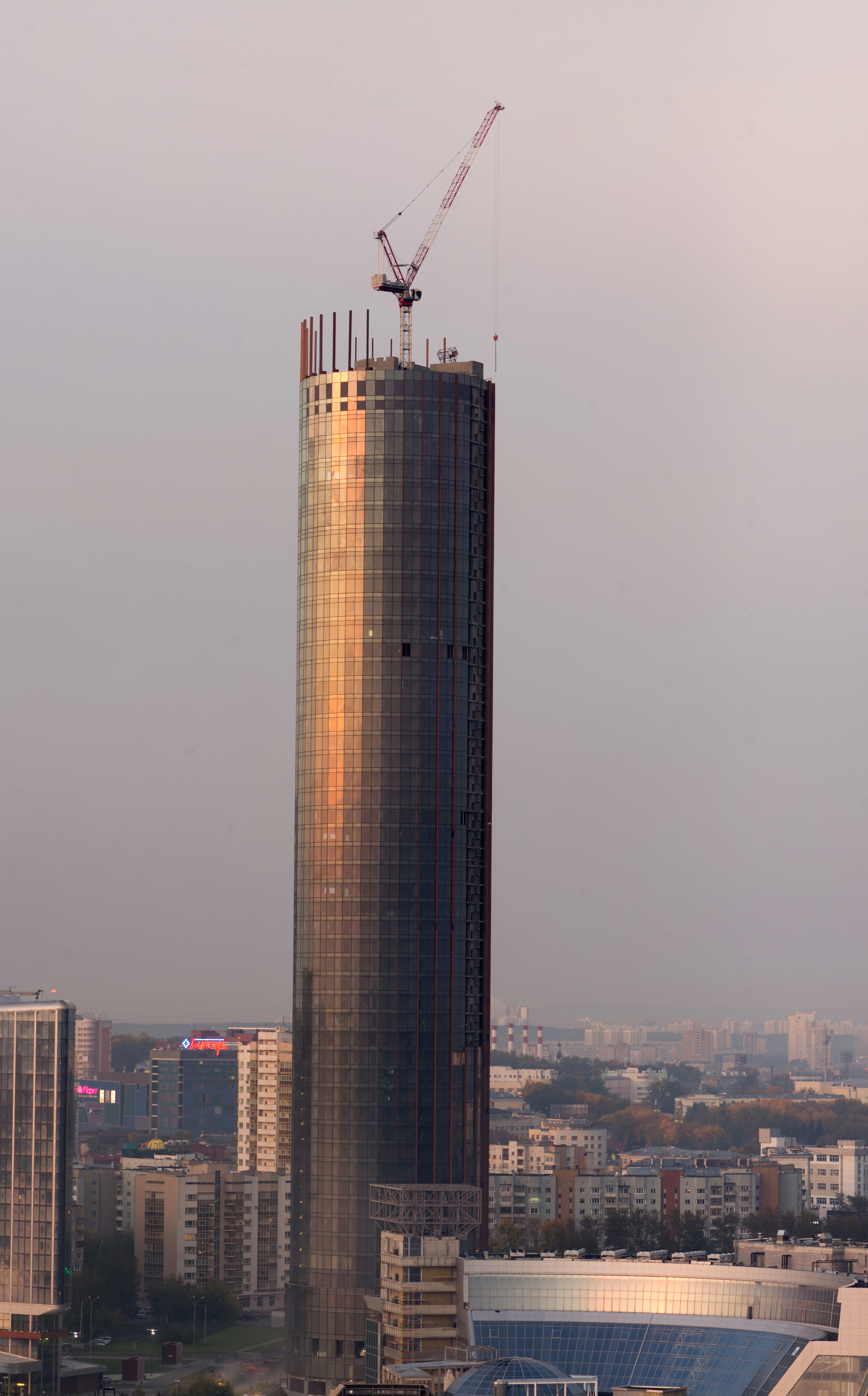
23 September 2014

== See also ==
- Federation Tower
- List of Tallest Buildings in Russia
- Yekaterinburg-City
