= Monument to Boris Yeltsin in Yekaterinburg =

Monument in Yekaterinburg, Russia

- Памятник Ельцину
- Interactive map of Monument to Boris Yeltsin in Yekaterinburg
- Location: Yekaterinburg, Russia
- Designer: Georgy Frangulyan
- Height: 10 m
- Opening date: February 1, 2011

The Monument to Boris Yeltsin in Yekaterinburg (Russian: Памятник Ельцину, romanized: Pamyatnik Yeltsinu) is a monument to Boris Yeltsin, the first President of Russia, Soviet party, Russian political and state leader, one of the founders of postsoviet Russia, in Yekaterinburg, the oblast center of his native region where he lived and worked for a long time. The monument is located near Boris Yeltsin Presidential Center. The monument is regularly subject to vandalism.

== General information ==
The monument is located on the Street of Boris Yeltsin in the business area of Yekaterinburg in the Downtown in front of the Demidov-Plaza congress hall, where the memorial and informational Yeltsin Presidential Legacy Center, curated by state Fund "Yeltsin Presidential Center" and charity Fund "Yeltsin Ural Center" (branch of The First President of Russia Yeltsin Fund), holds its premises.

The monument is a ten meter high stele-obelisk with a full-size Yeltsin bas-relief on a dark-grey pedestal on the stairs to the perron in front of Demidov-Plaza. It is noted, Yeltsin's image is directed forward with its motion and gaze, while the marble and the form of the monument are well designed to the Ural climate.

The monument was created by Moscow sculptor Georgy Frangulyan, who had previously made the headstone for Yeltsin's grave. According to Frangulyan, "not traditional bronze or granite, but white marble was chosen, as it is living, semitransparent material; this monument is not an obelisk, but a boulder, boulder in motion, such as Boris Nikolayevich was."

== History ==
The monument was opened on February 1, 2011, on Yeltsin's 80th birthday. The Third President of Russia Dmitry Medvedev arrived to Yekaterinburg for birthday celebrations and participated in the opening ceremony.

When opening the monument, which he liked, Medvedev noted, that "Russia must be grateful to Yeltsin for the country not leaving the way of changes in the most difficult period, conducted serious transformations and moves forward today".

The ceremony was also attended by Yeltsin's widow Naina Iosifovna, his relatives and friends, representatives of federal government, Sverdlovsk Oblast head Alexander Misharin, and heads of neighboring regions.

Opening of the monument caused protests of the local communists, while city authorities declined the rally against the opening. This resulted in Union of Communist Youth representatives' suing against the Yekaterinburg administration.

== Monument vandalism ==
On the night of August 23 to 24, 2012 the monument was vandalised by unidentified individuals: the figure of Yeltsin was doused with blue paint, letters on the pedestal were dislodged. Attempts to wash the monument in its place were unsuccessful, resulting in the decision of its dismantling. On October 1, 2012, after restoration works, the monument was returned to its place.

On November 7, 2017 (on the day of centennial of October Revolution) Igor Shchuka tried to set the monument on fire. For this act, he was sentenced to one year of manual labour in February 2018. After the sentence Shchuka managed to hide for almost a year, but then the oblast court cancelled the decision "due to a scintilla of evidence".
