= Yekaterinburg-City =

Commercial district in Russia

Coordinates: 56°50′34″N 60°35′22″E

- Екатеринбург-Сити
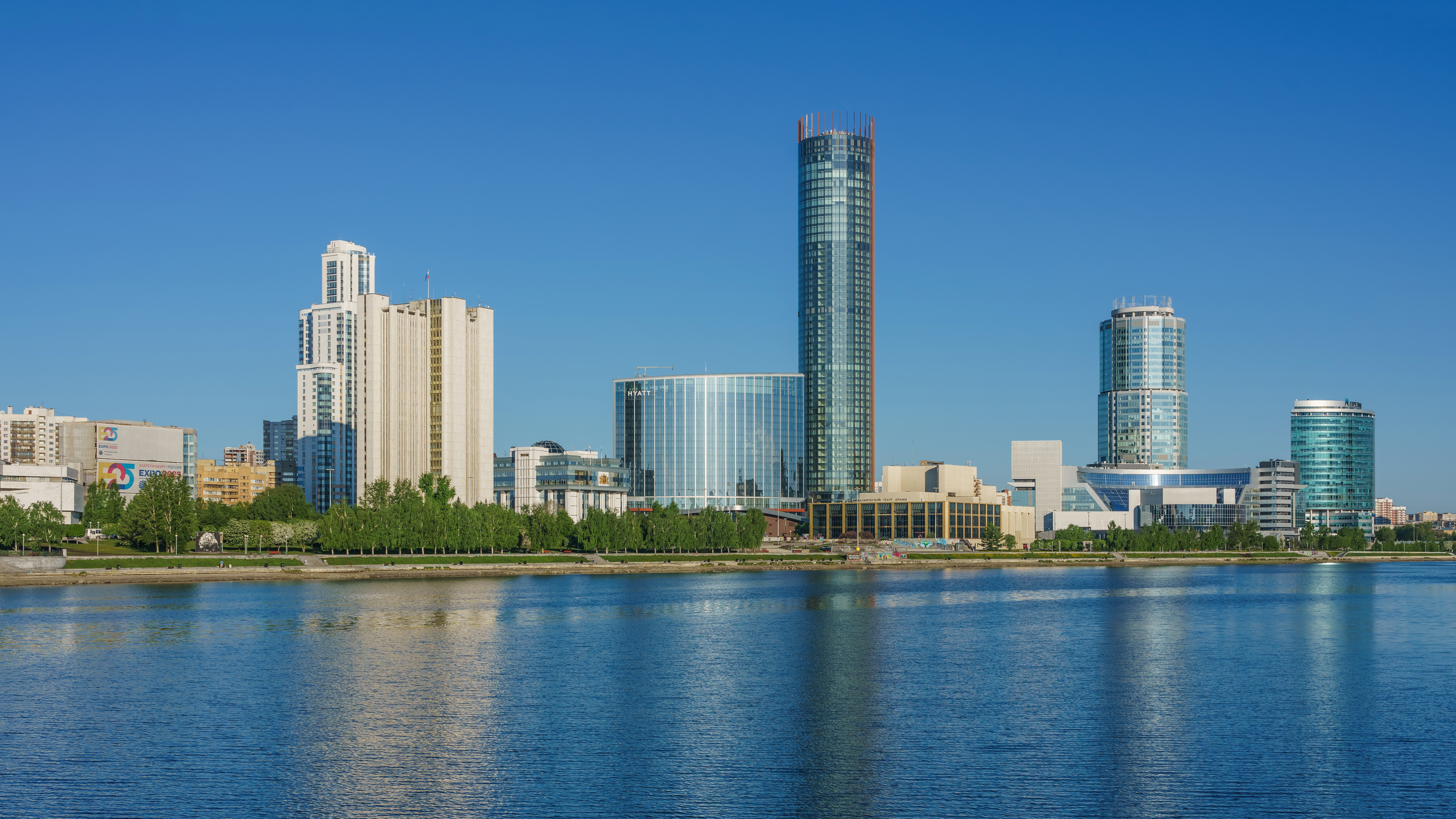
- Building President Baron de Gennin Hyatt Regency Ekaterinburg, Iset, Demidov Plaza
- Interactive map of the Yekaterinburg-City area

General information
- Location: Yekaterinburg, Russia
- Construction started: 2006
- Owner: Ural Mining and Metallurgical Company
- Operator: Yekaterinburg-City CJSC

Yekaterinburg-City (Russian: Екатеринбург-Сити, Yekaterinburg-Siti) is a commercial district near the center of the city of Yekaterinburg, Russia. It is located on Boris Yeltsin Street on the embankment of the Iset River and is currently under development. The area occupies five hectares.

The project's architectural planning and design belonged to French architectural bureau ValoDia and Pistre. The project's primary investor is UMMK-Holding. Construction would be responsible to Deputy Mayor for Construction and Architecture, Vladimir Kritskii. The project combines about 450,000 square meters of commercial space, offices, hotels, entertainment centers, cafes, and restaurants. The plans include 12 buildings: four office towers, a commercial area to accommodate typical small and average-sized businesses, a so-called trading gallery and two hotels.

Construction of Yekaterinburg-City started in 2007 and was scheduled to complete in 2014. Progress had a setback in 2014 due to the Russian financial crisis but government officials stated that it would still be finished by 2014. However, two skyscrapers of Yekaterinburg-City were finished over the expected completion date of 2014 in 2015.

Yekaterinburg-City currently has three skyscrapers, one hotel, and two high-rises.

== Buildings ==
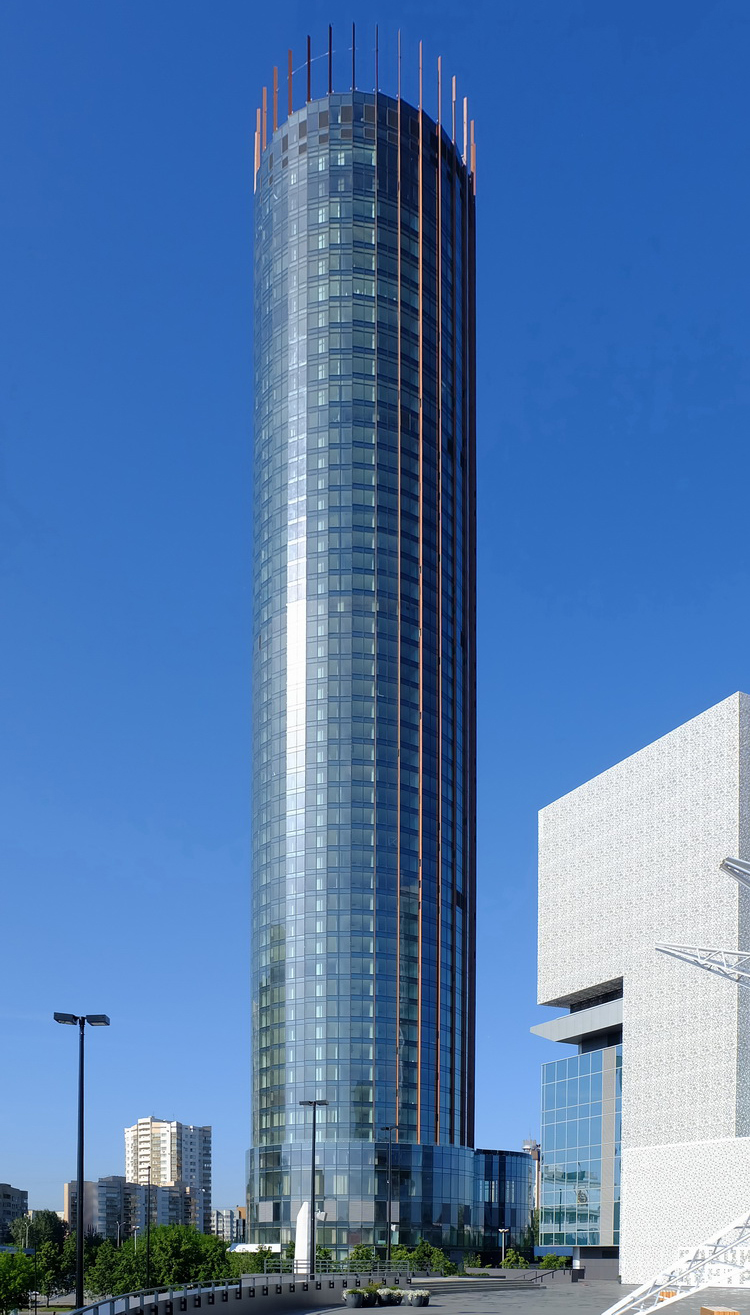
Iset Tower

=== Iset Tower ===
Iset is a 52-story residential skyscraper in Yekaterinburg-City. The skyscraper's height is 209 meters, and its total floor area is 80,983 square feet. Construction of the skyscraper began in 2010 and completed in 2015. Named after the Iset River which goes through central Yekaterinburg.

Iset is currently the tallest building of Yekaterinburg, the second tallest building in Russia outside of the capital city of Moscow, and the 16th tallest building in Russia.

- Total Area: 80,983 ft^{2} (7,524 m^{2})
- Total Investment: $230 million
- Floors: 52
- Height: 209 m (686 ft)
- Construction began: 2010
- Construction completed: 2015

=== De Luxe ===
De Luxe is a 43-story residential skyscraper in Yekaterinburg-City. The skyscraper's height is 138.79 meters. Construction of the skyscraper began in 2006 and completed in 2010.

- Floors: 43
- Height: 138.79 m (455 ft)
- Construction began: 2006
- Construction ended: 2010

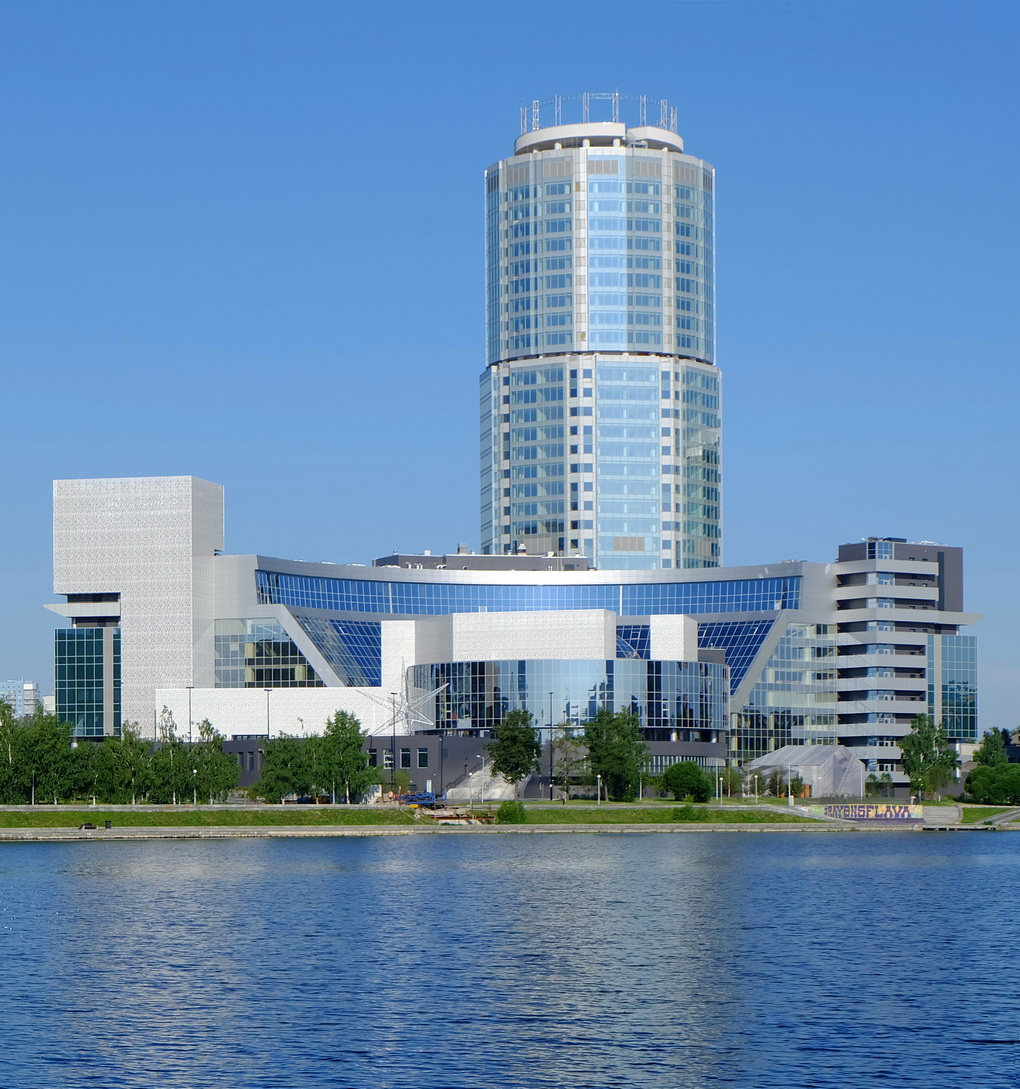
Business House "Demidov"

=== Business House "Demidov" ===
Demidov Plaza is a 35-story office skyscraper in Yekaterinburg-City. The skyscraper's height is 130.15 meters. Construction of the skyscraper began in 2007 and completed in 2015.

- Total Area: 130,090 ft^{2} (12,086 m^{2})
- Floors: 35
- Height: 130.15 m (427 ft)
- Construction began: 2007
- Construction completed: 2015

=== Sverdlovsk Oblast Government Building ===
The Sverdlovsk Oblast Government Building is a 22-story office high-rise used by the federal state of Sverdlovsk Oblast in Yekaterinburg-City. The skyscraper's height is 91.44 meters. Construction of the high-rise was completed in 1982.

- Floors: 22
- Height: 91.44 m (300 ft)
- Construction completed: 1982

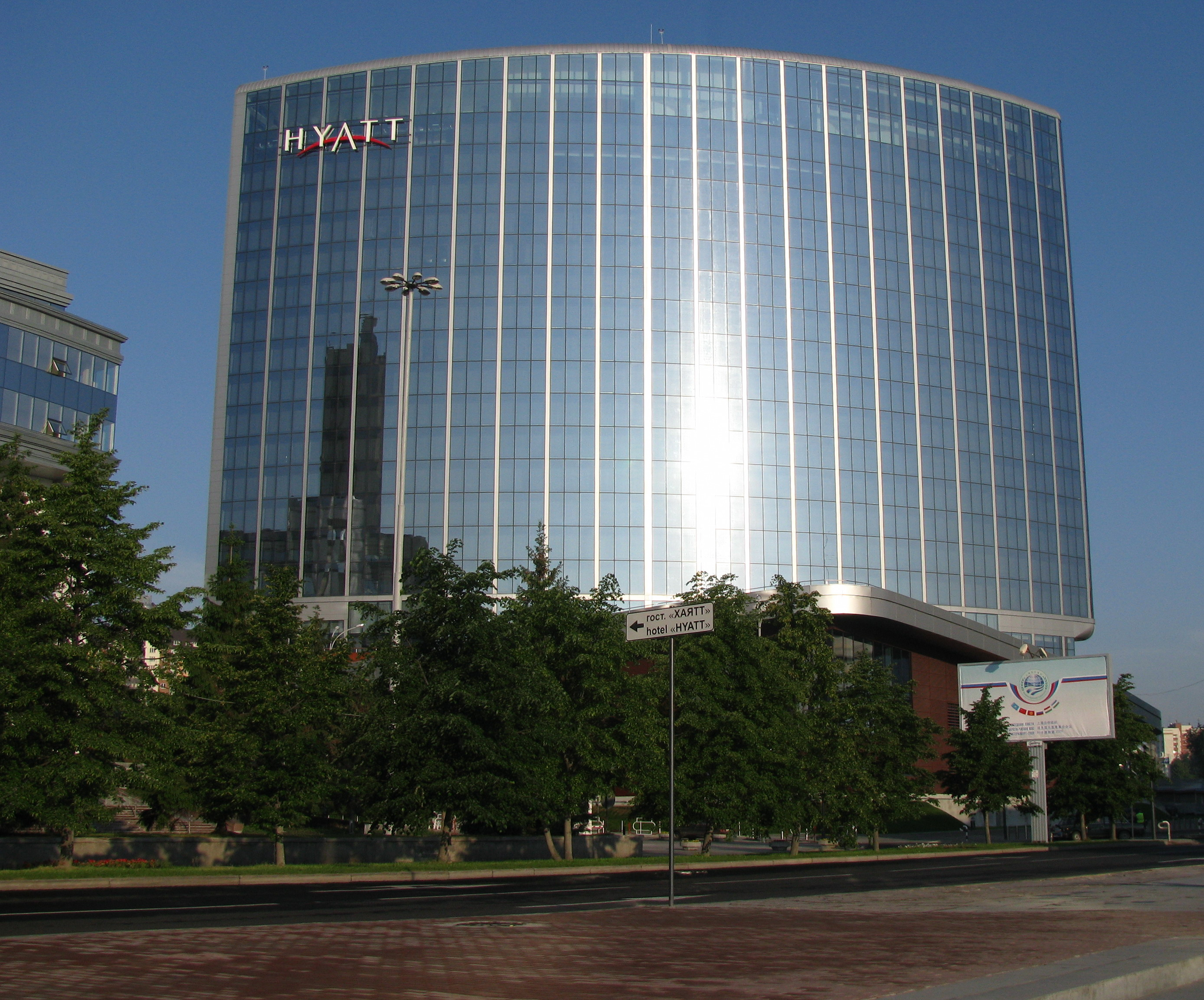
Hyatt Regency Ekaterinburg

=== Hyatt Regency Hotel ===
The Baron de Gennin Hyatt Regency Ekaterinburg is a 21-story 5 star hotel owned by Hyatt Regency, a brand of Hyatt, in Yekaterinburg-City. The high-rise's height is 83 meters. Construction of the high-rise began in 2005 and completed in 2009.

- Total Investment: $107 million
- Floors: 21
- Height: 83 m (272 ft)
- Construction began: 2005
- Construction ended: 2009

=== President ===
President is a 20-story office high-rise in Yekaterinburg-City. The high-rise's height is 82 meters. Construction of the high-rise was completed in 2013.

- Floors: 20
- Height: 82 m (269 ft)
- Construction ended: 2013

== See also ==
- Commercial district
- Moscow International Business Center
- Lakhta Center

== External links and sources ==
- Valode&Pistre
- Ekaterinburg-City.com - Projects and photos
- Photos of "Yekaterinburg-City"
- Renaissance construction — Photographes.
