= Dinamo (Yekaterinburg Metro) =

Yekaterinburg Metro Station

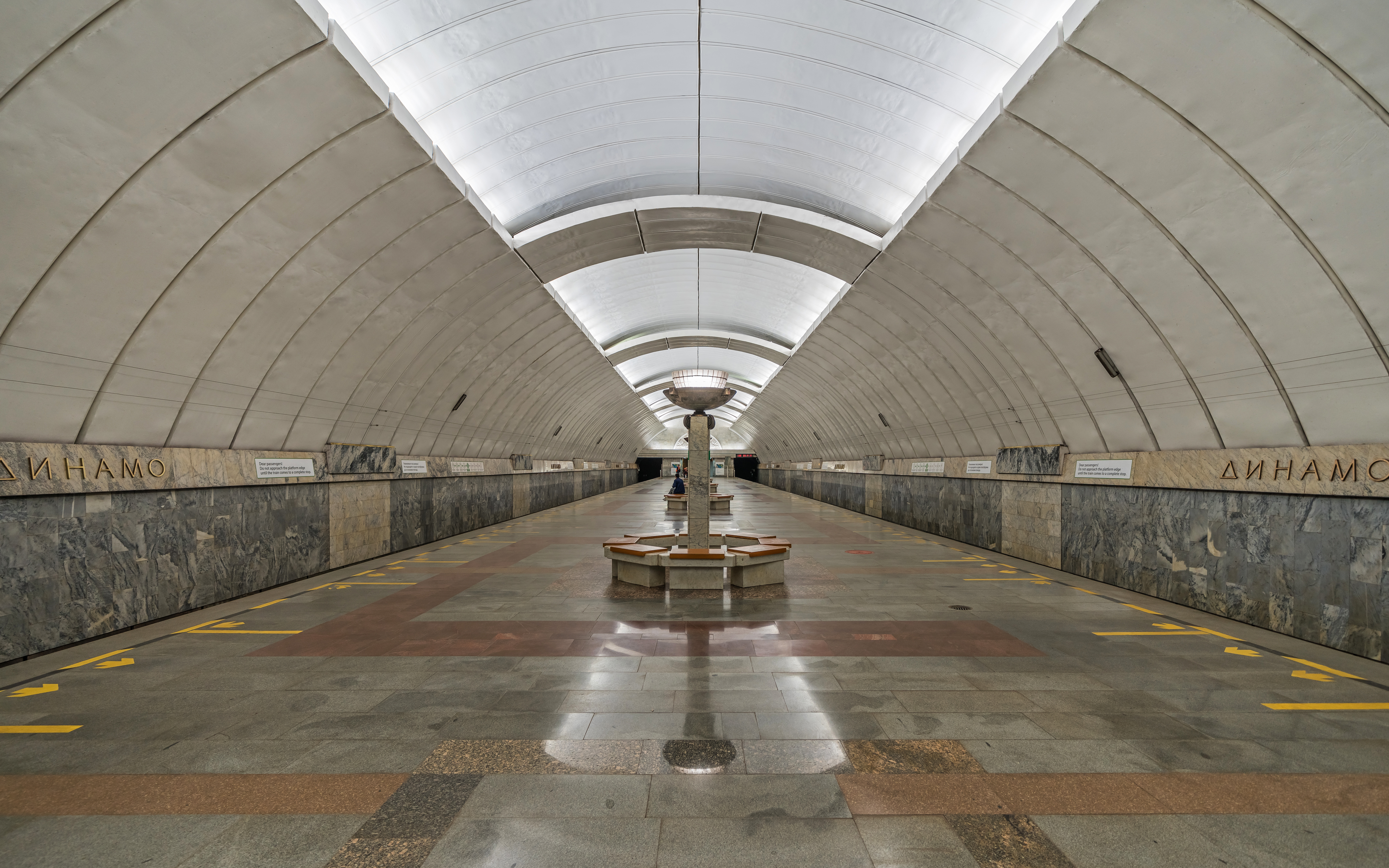

General information
- Coordinates: 56.847778°N 60.6°E
- System: Yekaterinburg Metro
- Line: First line
- Platforms: 1
- Tracks: 2

Construction
- Structure type: Island

History
- Opened: 1994-12-22

Services
Preceding station	Yekaterinburg Metro	Following station
Uralskaya towards Prospekt Kosmonavtov	First Line	Ploshchad 1905 Goda towards Botanicheskaya
Route map
Location

Dinamo (Russian: Динамо) is a station of the Yekaterinburg Metro which was opened on December 22, 1994. It is located between stations Uralskaya and Ploshchad 1905 Goda. Dinamo stadium and the "Uralochka" Palace of Sporting Games are near the metro station.

== Construction history ==
- 1973 — six wells were drilled in the area of the future "Dinamo" metro station to study the geological conditions under the city and the possibility of building a metro.
- February 1981 — the share of capital mining operations increased at the station, construction of surface sites began
- October 1981 — shaft sinking completed.
- June 1983 — tunneling of both tunnels began on the stretch to the station "Ploshchad 1905 Goda."
- January 1984 — preparation for driving the left and right tunnels towards the "Uralskaya" station has been completed.
- July 1987 — the first tubing was placed in the escalator tunnel at the station.
- December 1987 — after passing several hundred meters under the city pond, the builders made a connection in the left running tunnel to "Ploschad 1905 Goda" station.
- April 1988 — N. Chulpanov's complex brigade from the second section made the connection of the right underground corridor, which connected the stations "Ploshchad 1905 Goda" and "Dynamo." 736 meters were completed, including under the city pond.
- October 1988 — the complex brigade of L. K. Tonin from the fourth section ahead of schedule did work on the vault of the Dynamo station.
- January 1989 — work has begun on the construction of the inverse vault.
- February 1989 — after the connection, carried out by Y. Gnidin's brigade in the left running tunnel between the stations "Dynamo" and "Uralskaya", an underground passageway for the train was provided along the entire route from the city center to the station "Prospekt Kosmonavtov."
- June 1989 — installation of STP structures is complete.
- December 22, 1994 — the head of the city of Yekaterinburg approves the "Act of the state commission on acceptance into operation"
- December 22, 1994 — metro director I.A.Titov presents the electric train driver A. Bezlepkin with a symbolic key to the first stage of the Yekaterinburg metro. Passenger traffic is open.
- December 5, 2007 — a trolleybus line (route number 4) leading to the Pionersky microdistrict is connected to the station.

== Design ==
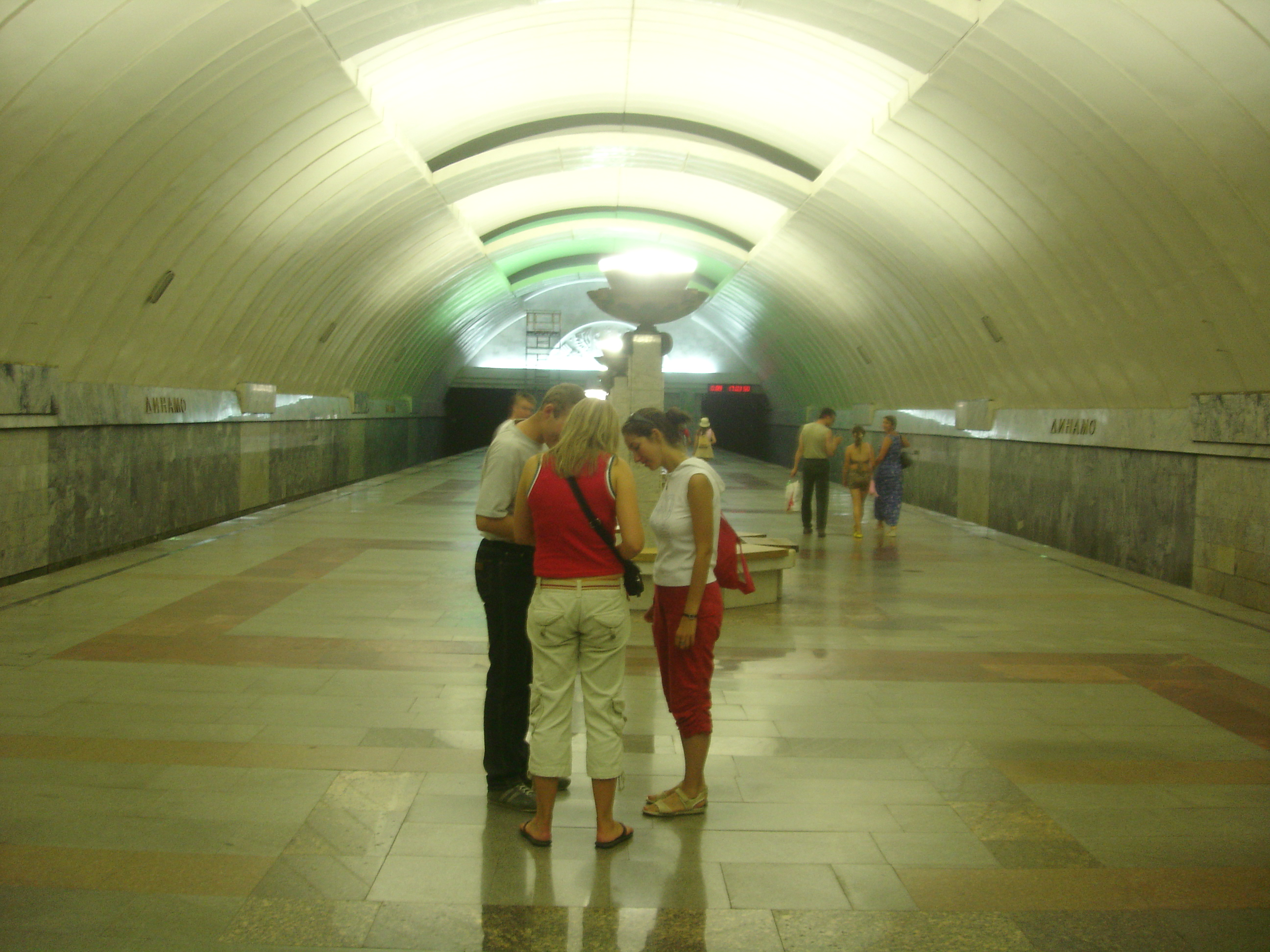

"Dinamo" is a one-vaulted station designed according to the sports themed project of Sverdlovskgrazhdanproekt Institute architects A. Zaslavsky and L. Maslennikova. At the end of the platform, against the backdrop of the end wall, there is a copy of the classical sculpture Discobolus (disc thrower) by the ancient Greek sculptor Myron who was from the middle of the 5th century BC. There is a series of large openings in the upper part of the vault with soft reflected light. The track walls and floors are faced with red Karelian granite and "gazgan" patterned marble. Along the axis of the hall there are 5 lighting fixtures resembling torches. Recently (as of February 2011), sodium lamps (with bright yellow light) were installed in three torch lamps (1st, 3rd and 5th) instead of mercury-helium lamps (giving violet light).

== Ground Public transportation ==
For a long time, the station was deprived of the attention of public transport. Currently, the station has an exit to one stop: the Yekaterinburg trolleybus.

Trolleybus
No.	toward metro station	End Point 1	End Point 2
4	«Dinamo»	metro station «Dinamo»	Sulimova street
