= Yekaterinburg fortress =

Former Russian Empire fortress

- Екатеринбургская крепость
- Yekaterinburg, Ural Federal District in Russia
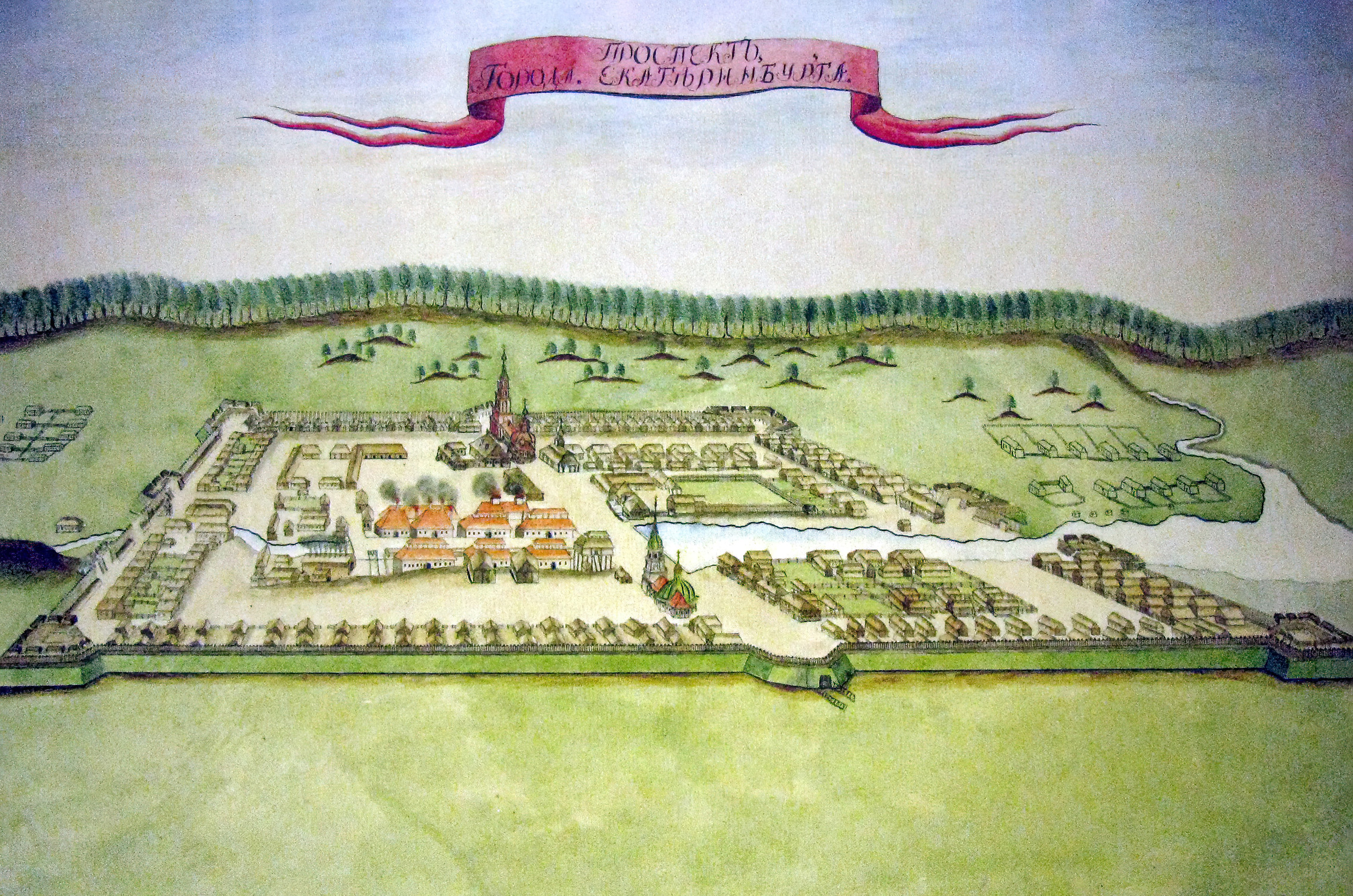
- Artist's depiction of the fortress at Yekaterinburg in the mid 1730s

Site information
- Type: Earthwork fortress
- Owner: Russian Empire

Site history
- Built: 1723
- In use: 1723 to circa 1800
- Fate: demolished

Yekaterinburg fortress, romanized in English as Ekaterinburg fortress, (Russian: Екатеринбургская крепость) was a historic fortress located in modern-day Yekaterinburg, Russia. Built during the early 18th century, the fortress served as a defensive fortification in the early history of Yekaterinburg before gradually being dismantled.

== History ==
During the early 18th century, the settlement at Yekaterinburg was one of the Russian Empire's most easterly establishments, bordering on the Siberian frontier. The settlement was located on the banks of the Iset river and as such was strategically important, while the Ural mountains' rich mineral deposits made the region a viable candidate for settlement. In 1721, work had begun on the construction of a foundry, further increasing the strategic importance of the settlement.

To better project military power in the area, construction of a new fortress around the Yekaterinburg settlement began on 3 March 1723, starting with the establishment of a barracks. Work began on damming the Iset river that same year, the majority of which was carried out by the 38th Tobolsk Infantry Regiment.

As Yekaterinburg grew, the fortress was likewise expanded to form a square defensive perimeter. By 1724 a wooden palisade and ditch had been built around the fortress' buildings, with the already constructed dam allowing for the fortress to be built on both sides of the Iset. In 1729 the Russian government granted permission for the fortress' facilities to be expanded, allowing for the construction of an additional foundry, warehouse, mill, and bakery. In addition to producing and storing supplies needed for the local garrison, the fortress' structure helped to shape the early urban history of Yekaterinburg, with many of the fortification's gates forming the heads of future streets. During the mid-1730s, the fortress' outer walls were expanded and the fortress took on a hexagonal shape.

By the 1740s the fortress' original wooden palisades had begun to decay, leading to the fortress being described as being dilapidated. From 1743 to 1746, the fortress was renovated, with the fortification's original walls being demolished and replaced with earthen palisades. Yekaterinburg itself continued to expand and by the mid-18th century the city had outgrown the fortress walls.

In the 1770s, rising unrest (most notably Pugachev's Rebellion) in other parts of the empire spurred local authorities to modernize the fortress again; from 1774 to 1778, the fortress was expanded so that it once again surrounded the entire city of Yekaterinburg. In addition, new palisades and earthworks were constructed and artillery batteries established. The new fortress also had six gates as opposed to the previous four.

Despite these expansion efforts, by the 1780s the city had once again expanded outside the boundaries of the fortress and by the 1790s portions of the fortress wall were being demolished. According to one source, a plan to build a new stonework fortress to replace the aging earthwork fortification was proposed but never implemented. The remains of the fortress were gradually demolished as Yekaterinburg expanded into the 19th century.
