= Neoclassicism =

Western cultural movement

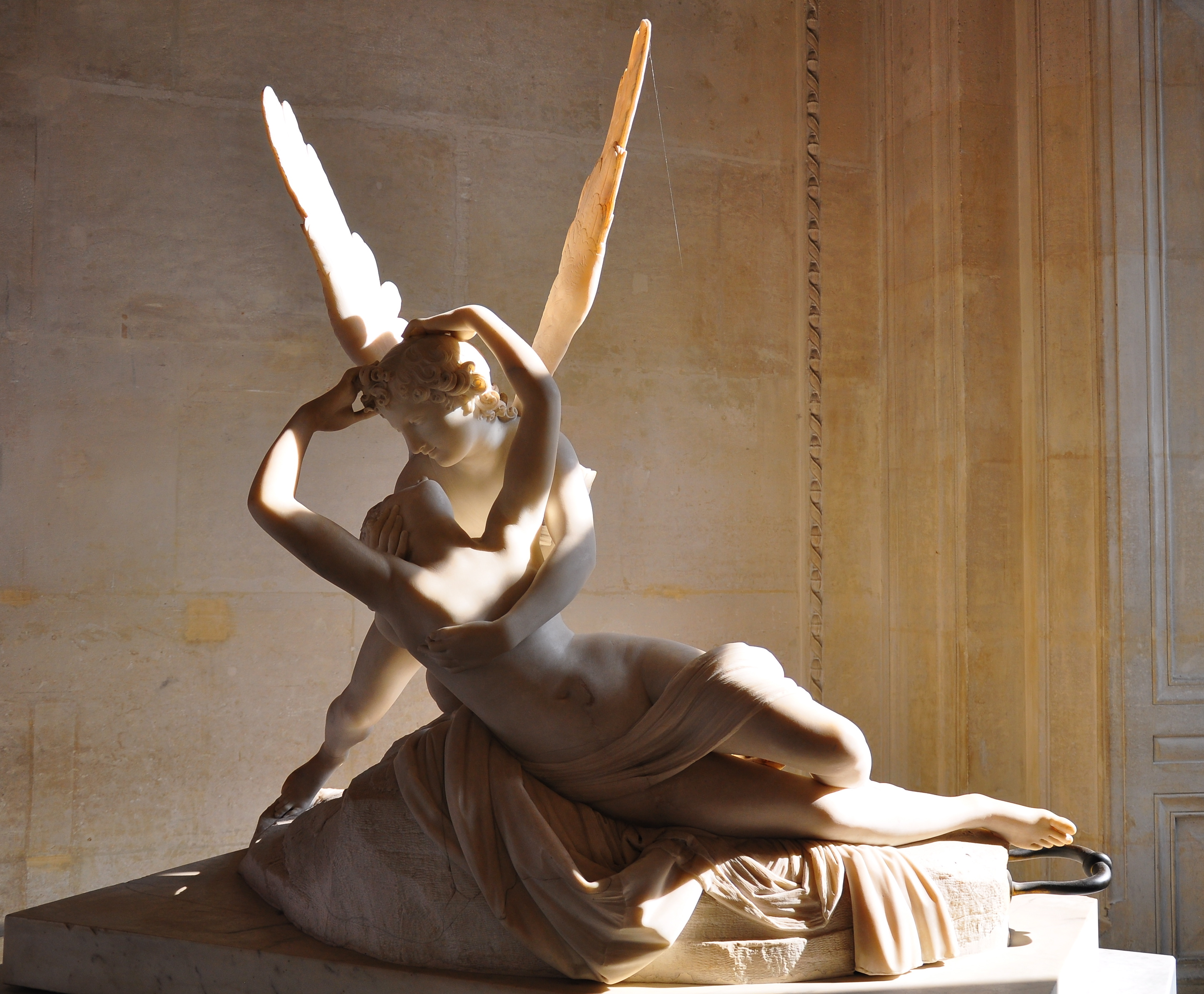
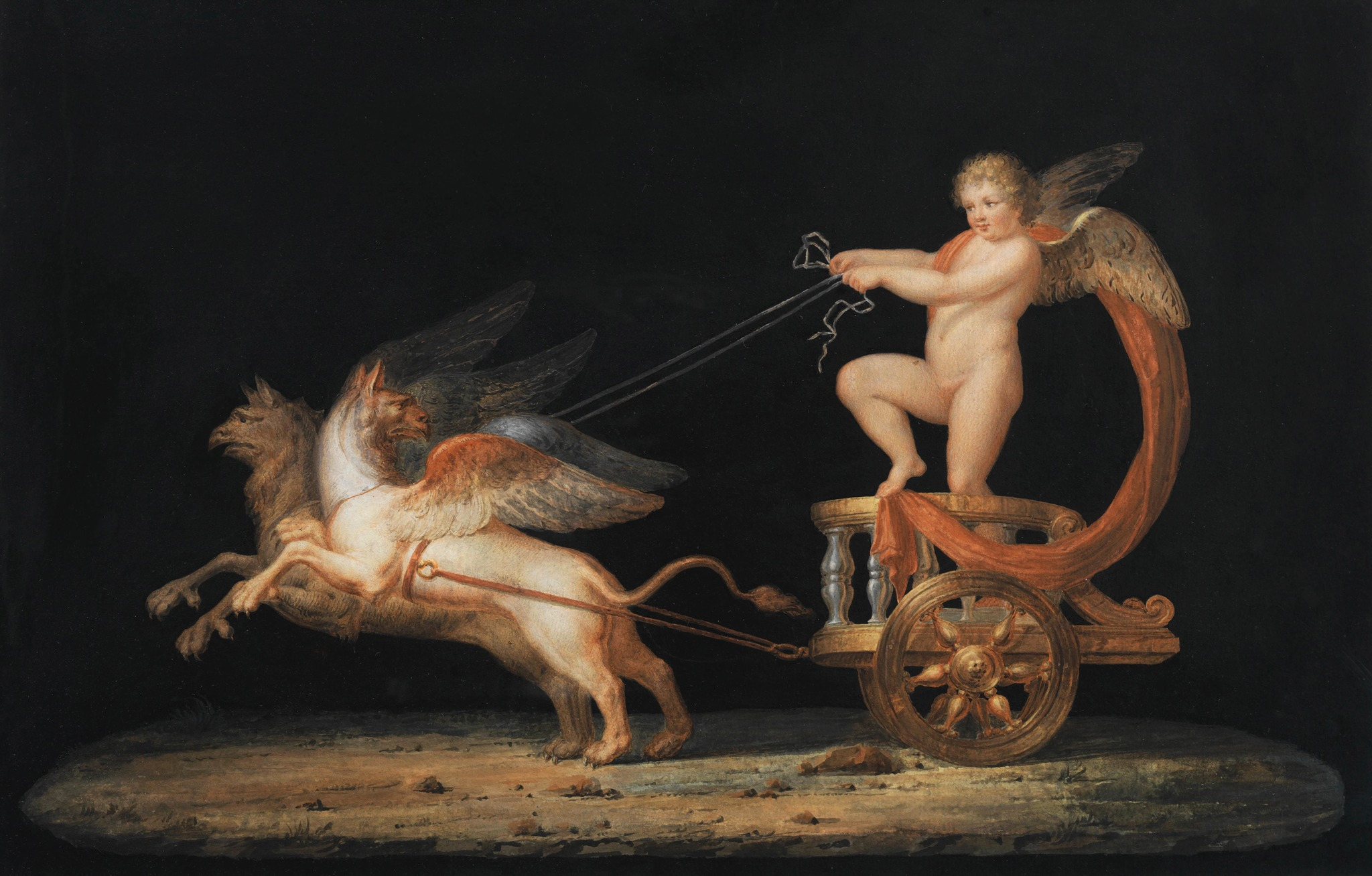
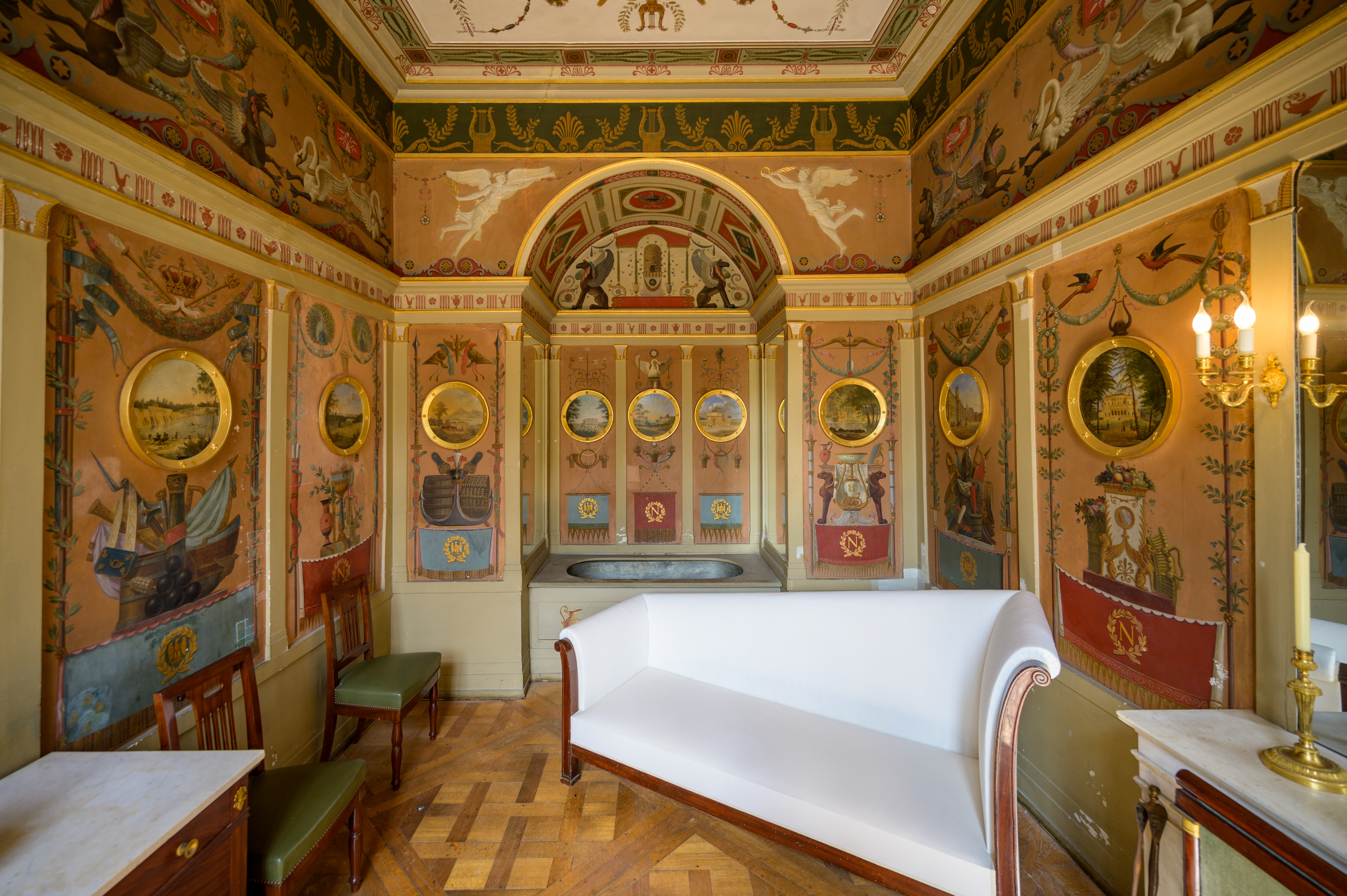
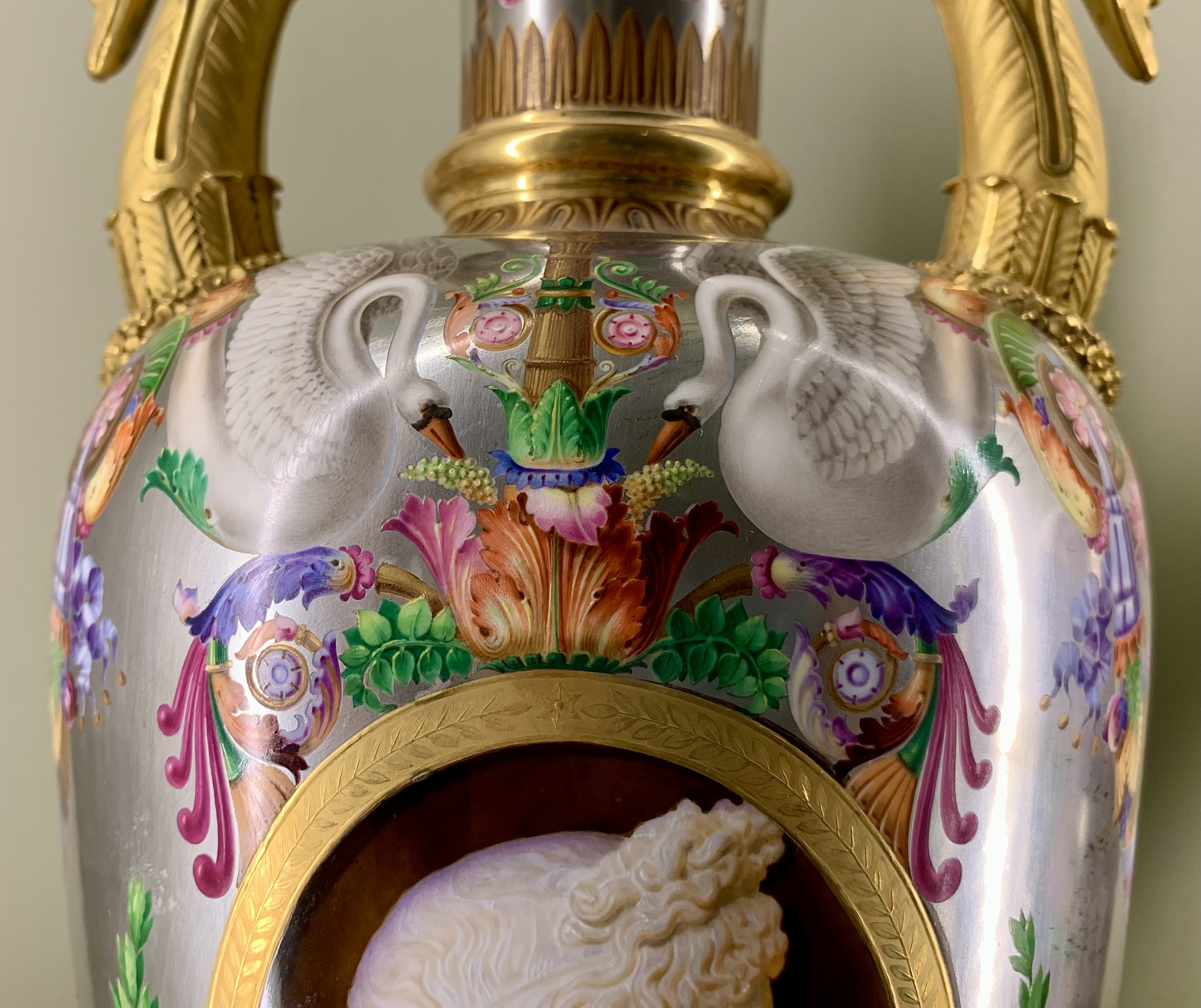
- Top: Psyche Revived by Cupid's Kiss, by Antonio Canova, 1787, marble, Louvre; Second: Cupid Driving a Chariot Pulled by Griffins, by Michelangelo Maestri, c. 1800; Third: Napoleon's bath of the Château de Rambouillet, Rambouillet, France, painted by Godard and Jean Vasserot, 1806; Bottom: Detail with swans and rinceaux on a vase; produced by Antoine Béranger, Alexandre-Théodore Brongniart, and the Sèvres Porcelain Manufactory, hard-paste porcelain with gilded bronze mounts, Louvre

Neoclassicism, also spelled Neo-classicism, emerged as a Western cultural movement in the decorative and visual arts, literature, theatre, music, and architecture that drew inspiration from the art and culture of classical antiquity. Neoclassicism was born in Rome, largely due to the writings of Johann Joachim Winckelmann during the rediscovery of Pompeii and Herculaneum. Its popularity expanded throughout Europe as a generation of European art students finished their Grand Tour and returned from Italy to their home countries with newly rediscovered Greco-Roman ideals. The main Neoclassical movement emerged from the 18th-century Age of Enlightenment, and reached its peak in the early-to-mid-19th century, eventually competing with Romanticism. In architecture, the style endured throughout the 19th, 20th, and into the 21st century.

European Neoclassicism in the visual arts began c. 1760 in opposition to the dominant Rococo style. Rococo architecture emphasizes grace, ornamentation and asymmetry; Neoclassical architecture is based on the principles of simplicity and symmetry, which were seen as virtues of the arts of Ancient Rome and Ancient Greece, and drawn directly from 16th-century Renaissance Classicism. Each "neo"-classicism movement selects some models among the range of possible classics that are available to it, and ignores others. Between 1765 and 1830, Neoclassical proponents—writers, speakers, patrons, collectors, artists and sculptors—paid homage to an idea of the artistic generation associated with Phidias, but sculpture examples they actually embraced were more likely to be Roman copies of Hellenistic sculptures. They ignored both Archaic Greek art and the works of late antiquity. The discovery of ancient Palmyra's "Rococo" art through engravings in Robert Wood's The Ruins of Palmyra came as a revelation. With Greece largely unexplored and considered a dangerous territory of the Ottoman Empire, Neoclassicists' appreciation of Greek architecture was predominantly mediated through drawings and engravings which were subtly smoothed and regularized, "corrected" and "restored" monuments of Greece, not always consciously.

The Empire style, a second phase of Neoclassicism in architecture and the decorative arts, had its cultural centre in Paris in the Napoleonic era. Especially in architecture, but also in other fields, Neoclassicism remained a force long after the early 19th century, with periodic waves of revivalism into the 20th and even the 21st centuries, especially in the United States and Russia.

== History ==
Neoclassicism is a revival of the many styles and spirit of classic antiquity inspired directly from the classical period, which coincided and reflected the developments in philosophy and other areas of the Age of Enlightenment, and was initially a reaction against the excesses of the preceding Rococo style. While the movement is often described as the opposed counterpart of Romanticism, this is a great over-simplification that tends not to be sustainable when specific artists or works are considered. The case of the supposed main champion of late Neoclassicism, Ingres, demonstrates this especially well. The revival can be traced to the establishment of formal archaeology.

The Italian archaeologist and art theorist Giovanni Pietro Bellori is considered the forerunner of Neoclassicism. In 1664 he delivered a lecture on the 'Ideal' in art at the Accademia di San Luca, Rome, which became the seminal statement of idealist art theory. Bellori's lecture had a decisive influence on European academic theory and later became the theoretical basis of the Neoclassicism preached by Winckelmann.

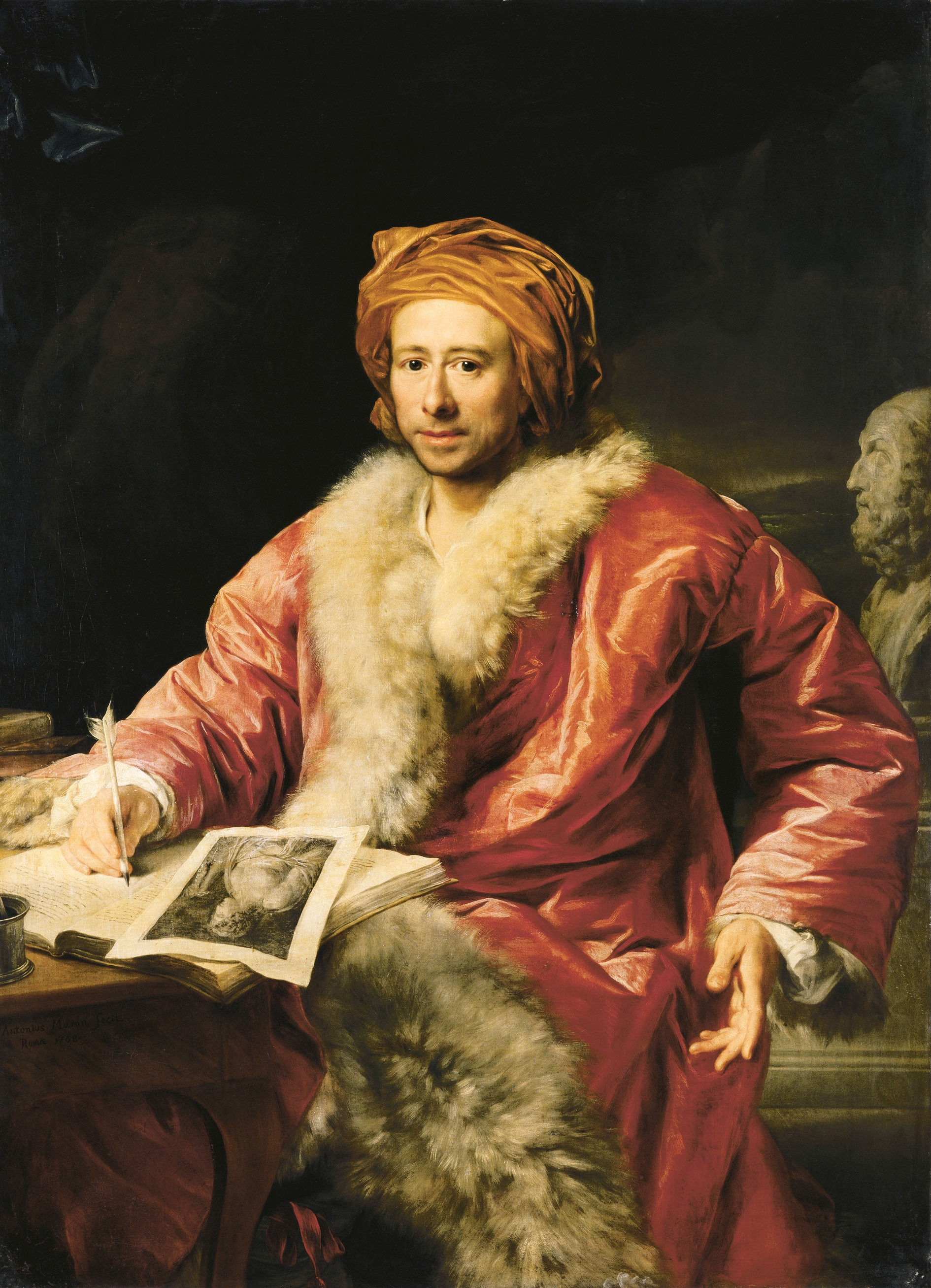
Johann Joachim Winckelmann, often called "the father of archaeology"

The writings of Johann Joachim Winckelmann were important in shaping this movement in both architecture and the visual arts. His books Thoughts on the Imitation of Greek Works in Painting and Sculpture (1755) and Geschichte der Kunst des Alterthums ("History of Ancient Art", 1764) were the first to distinguish sharply between Ancient Greek and Roman art, and define periods within Greek art, tracing a trajectory from growth to maturity and then imitation or decadence that continues to have influence to the present day. Winckelmann believed that art should aim at "noble simplicity and calm grandeur", and praised the idealism of Greek art, in which he said we find "not only nature at its most beautiful but also something beyond nature, namely certain ideal forms of its beauty, which, as an ancient interpreter of Plato teaches us, come from images created by the mind alone". The theory was very far from new in Western art, but his emphasis on close copying of Greek models was: "The only way for us to become great or if this be possible, inimitable, is to imitate the ancients".

The Industrial Revolution saw global transition of human economy towards more efficient and stable manufacturing processes. There was tremendous material advancement and increased prosperity. With the advent of the Grand Tour, a fad of collecting antiquities began that laid the foundations of many great collections spreading a Neoclassical revival throughout Europe. "Neoclassicism" in each art implies a particular canon of a "classical" model.

In English, the term "Neoclassicism" is used primarily of the visual arts; the similar movement in English literature, which began considerably earlier, is called Augustan literature. This, which had been dominant for several decades, was beginning to decline by the time Neoclassicism in the visual arts became fashionable. Though terms differ, the situation in French literature was similar. In music, the period saw the rise of classical music, and "Neoclassicism" is used of 20th-century developments. However, the operas of Christoph Willibald Gluck represented a specifically Neoclassical approach, spelt out in his preface to the published score of Alceste (1769), which aimed to reform opera by removing ornamentation, increasing the role of the chorus in line with Greek tragedy, and using simpler unadorned melodic lines.

The term "Neoclassical" was not invented until the mid-19th century, and at the time the style was described by such terms as "the true style", "reformed" and "revival"; what was regarded as being revived varying considerably. Ancient models were certainly very much involved, but the style could also be regarded as a revival of the Renaissance, and especially in France as a return to the more austere and noble Baroque of the age of Louis XIV, for which a considerable nostalgia had developed as France's dominant military and political position started a serious decline. Ingres's coronation portrait of Napoleon even borrowed from Late Antique consular diptychs and their Carolingian revival, to the disapproval of critics.

Neoclassicism was strongest in architecture, sculpture and the decorative arts, where classical models in the same medium were relatively numerous and accessible; examples from ancient painting that demonstrated the qualities that Winckelmann's writing found in sculpture were and are lacking. Winckelmann was involved in the dissemination of knowledge of the first large Roman paintings to be discovered, at Pompeii and Herculaneum and, like most contemporaries except for Gavin Hamilton, was unimpressed by them, citing Pliny the Younger's comments on the decline of painting in his period.

As for painting, Greek painting was utterly lost: Neoclassicist painters imaginatively revived it, partly through bas-relief friezes, mosaics and pottery painting, and partly through the examples of painting and decoration of the High Renaissance of Raphael's generation, frescos in Nero's Domus Aurea, Pompeii and Herculaneum, and through renewed admiration of Nicolas Poussin. Much "Neoclassical" painting is more classicizing in subject matter than in anything else. A fierce, but often very badly informed, dispute raged for decades over the relative merits of Greek and Roman art, with Winckelmann and his fellow Hellenists generally being on the winning side.

== Painting, drawing and printmaking ==
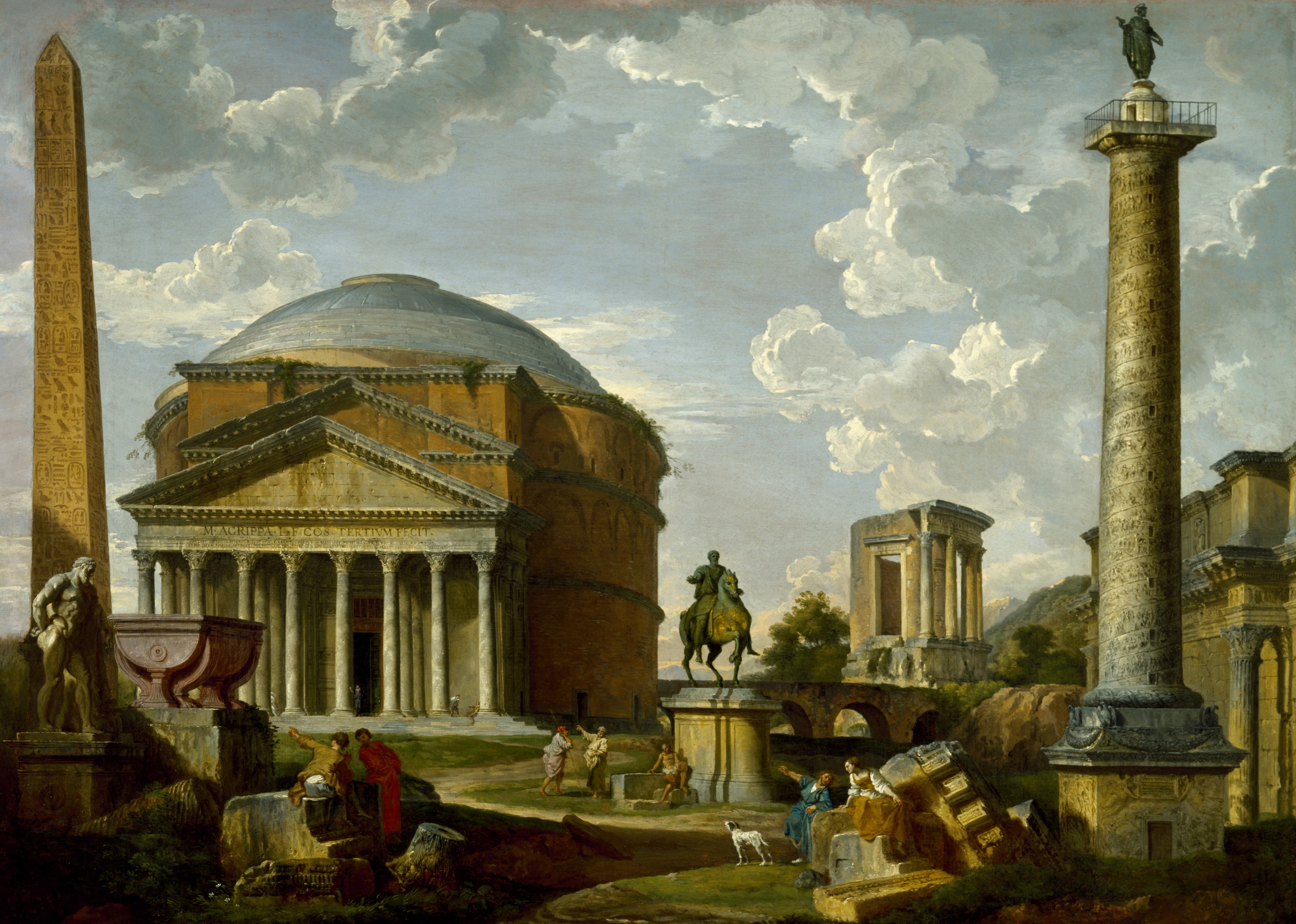
Fantasy View with the Pantheon and other Monuments of Ancient Rome; by Giovanni Paolo Panini; 1737; oil on canvas; 98.9 x 137.49 cm; Museum of Fine Arts, Houston, US

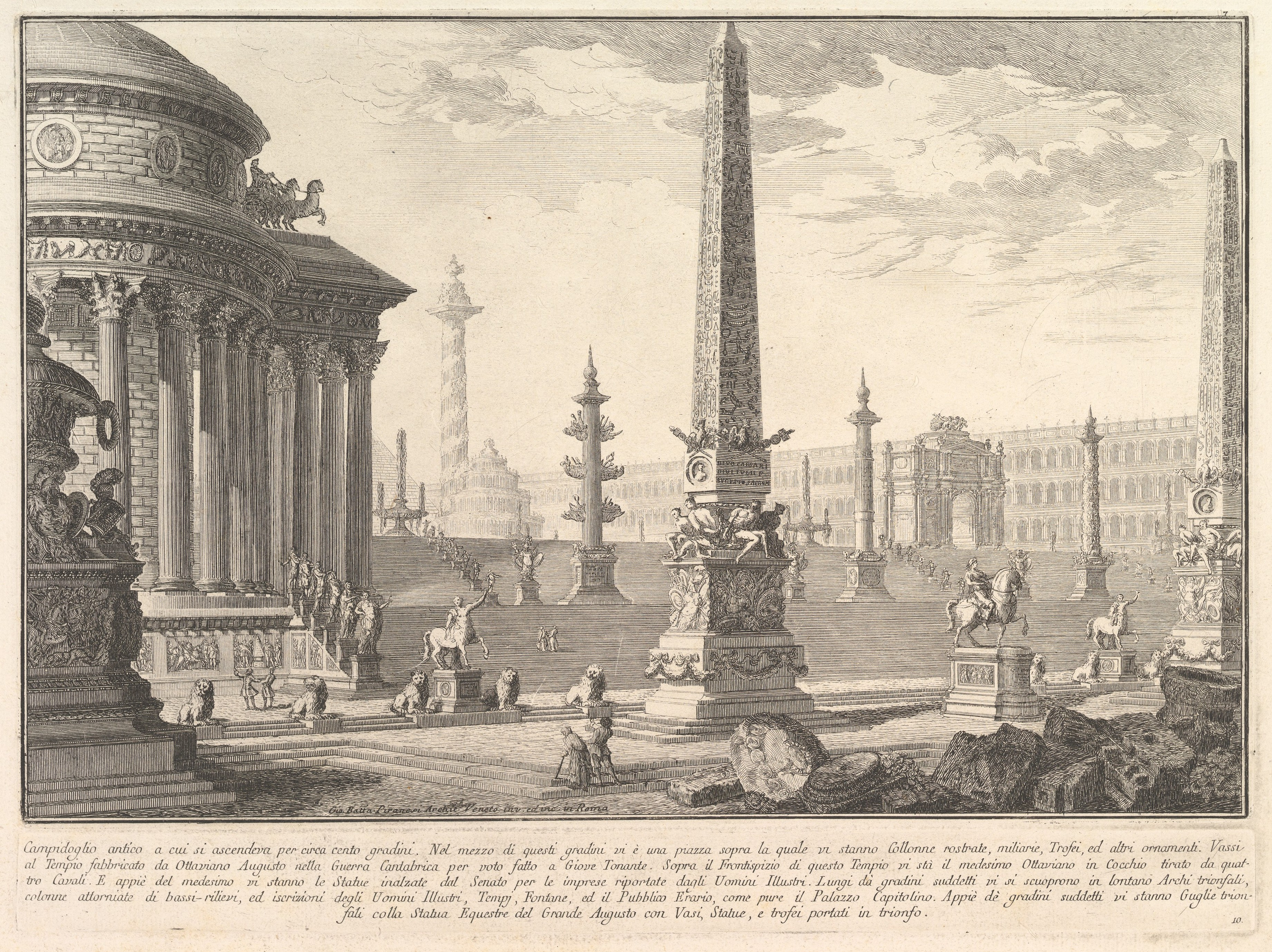
The ancient Capitol ascended by approximately one hundred steps . . .; by Giovanni Battista Piranesi; c.1750; etching; size of the entire sheet: 33.5 × 49.4 cm; Metropolitan Museum of Art, New York City

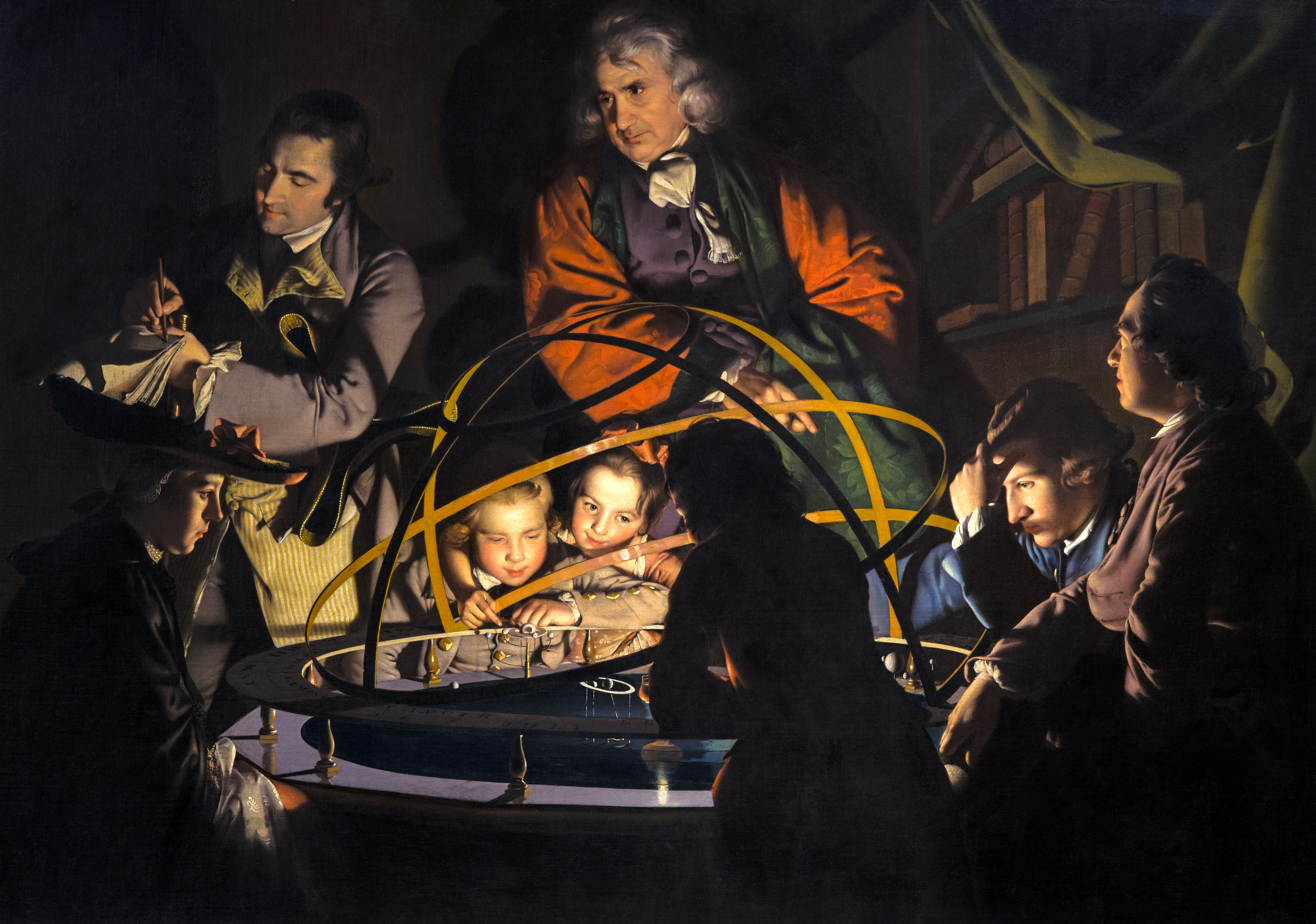
A Philosopher Lecturing on the Orrery; by Joseph Wright of Derby; c.1766; oil on canvas; 1.47 x 2.03 m; Derby Museum and Art Gallery, Derby, England

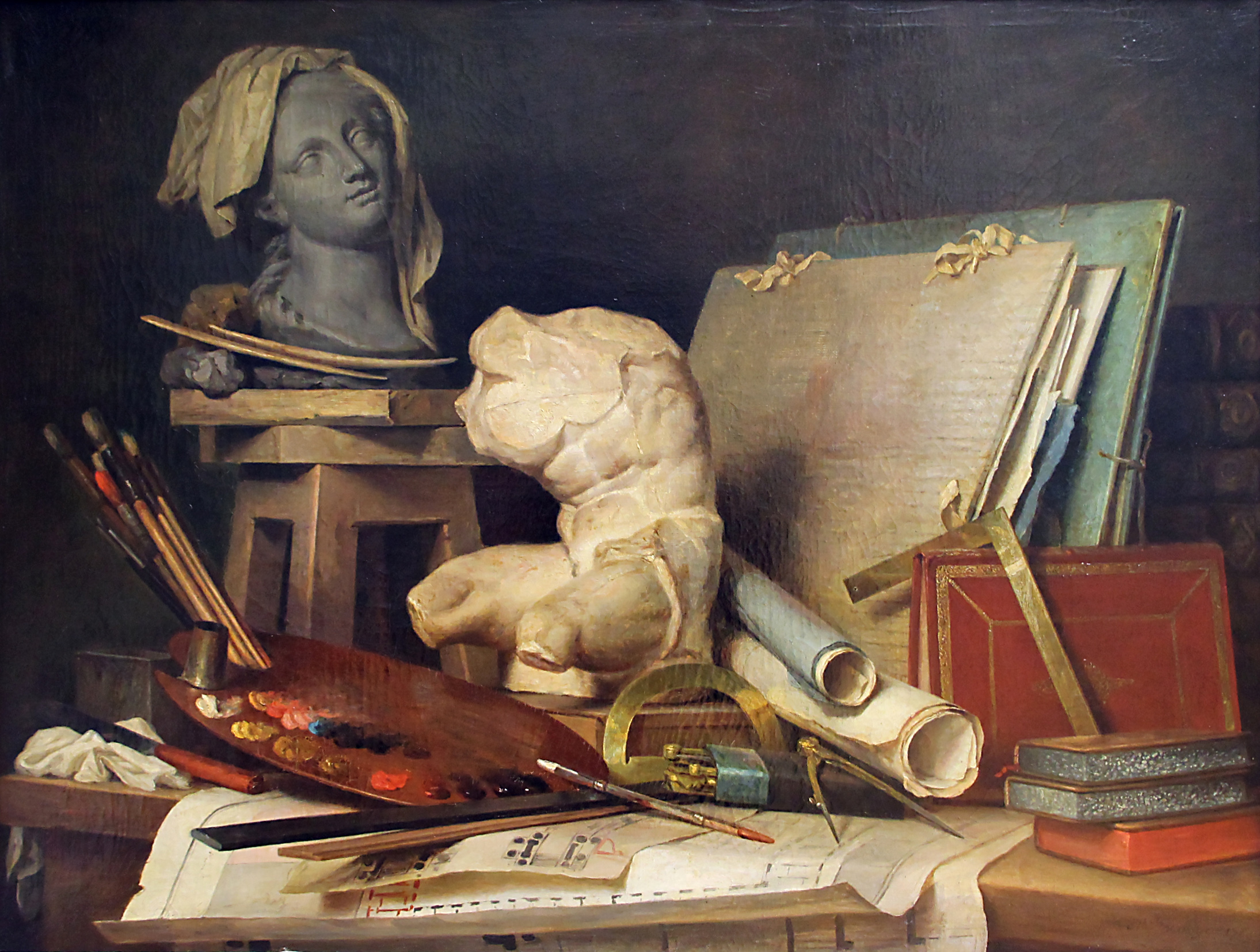
The Attributes of the Arts; by Anne Vallayer-Coster; 1769; oil on canvas; 90 x 121 cm; Louvre

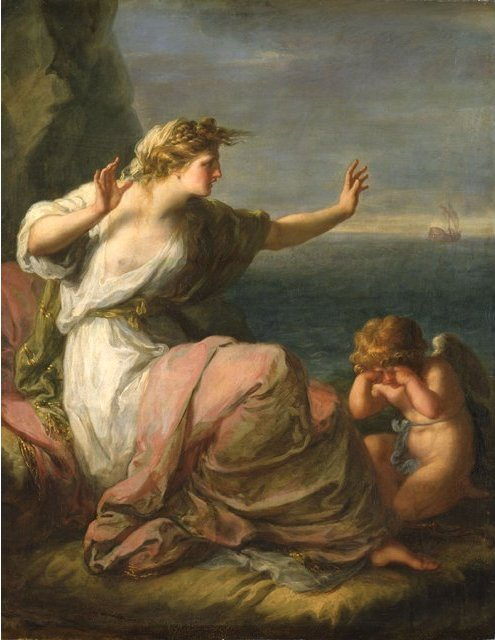
Ariadne Abandoned; by Angelica Kauffmann; before 1782; oil on canvas; 88 x 70.5 cm; Gemäldegalerie Alte Meister, Dresden, Germany

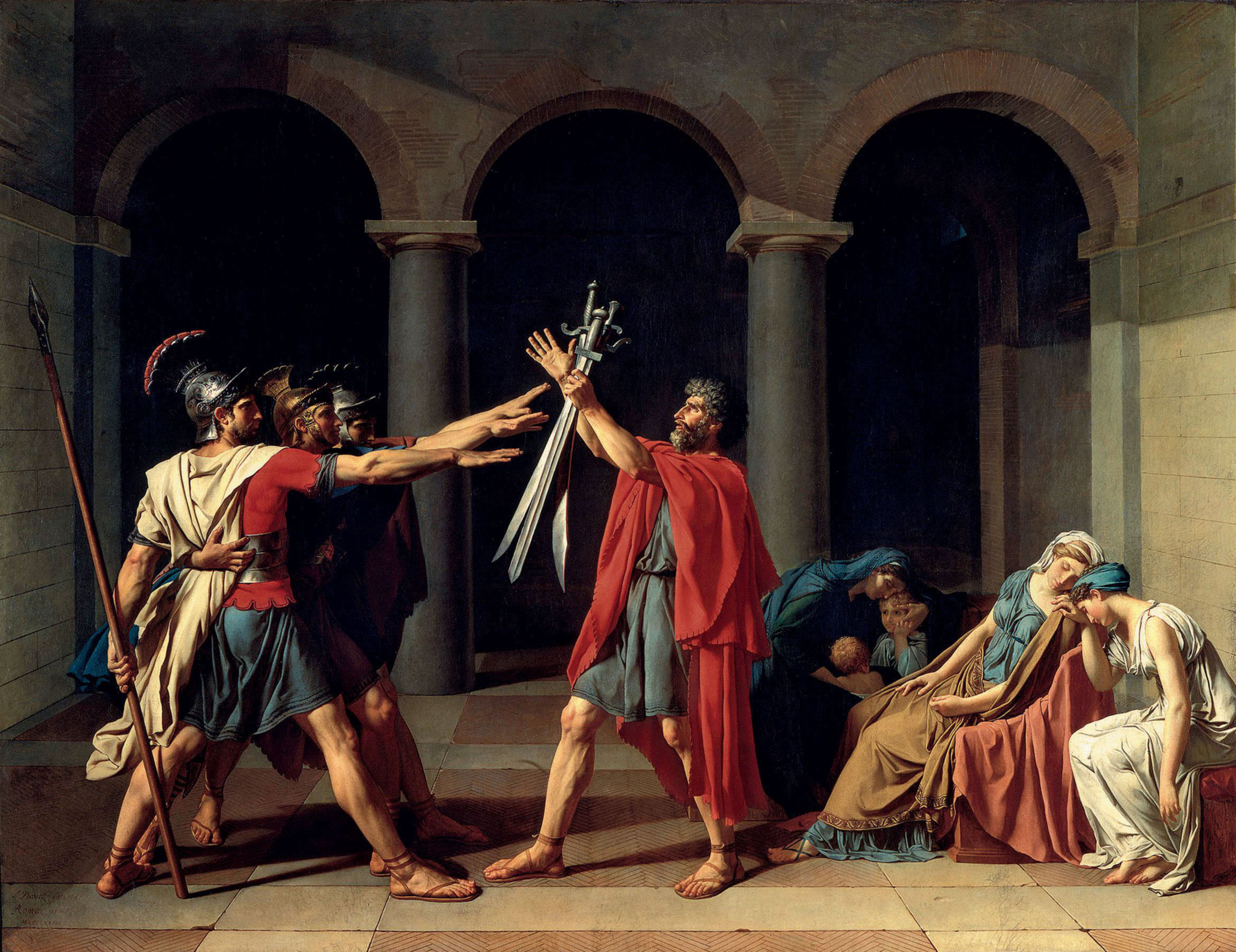
Oath of the Horatii; by Jacques-Louis David; 1784; oil on canvas; 3.3 x 4.27 m; Louvre

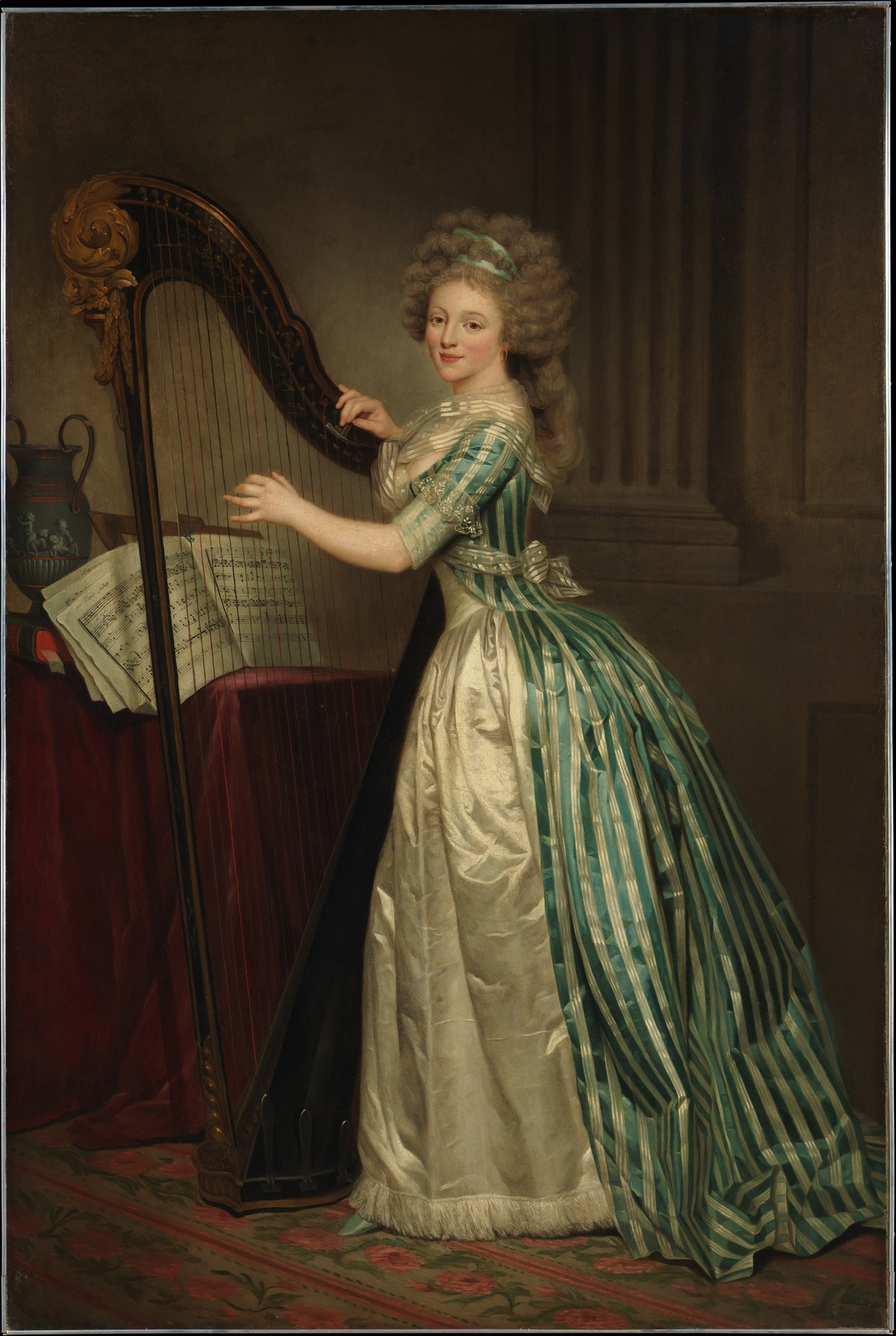
Self-Portrait with a Harp; by Rose-Adélaïde Ducreux; 1791; oil on canvas; 193 x 128.9 cm; Metropolitan Museum of Art

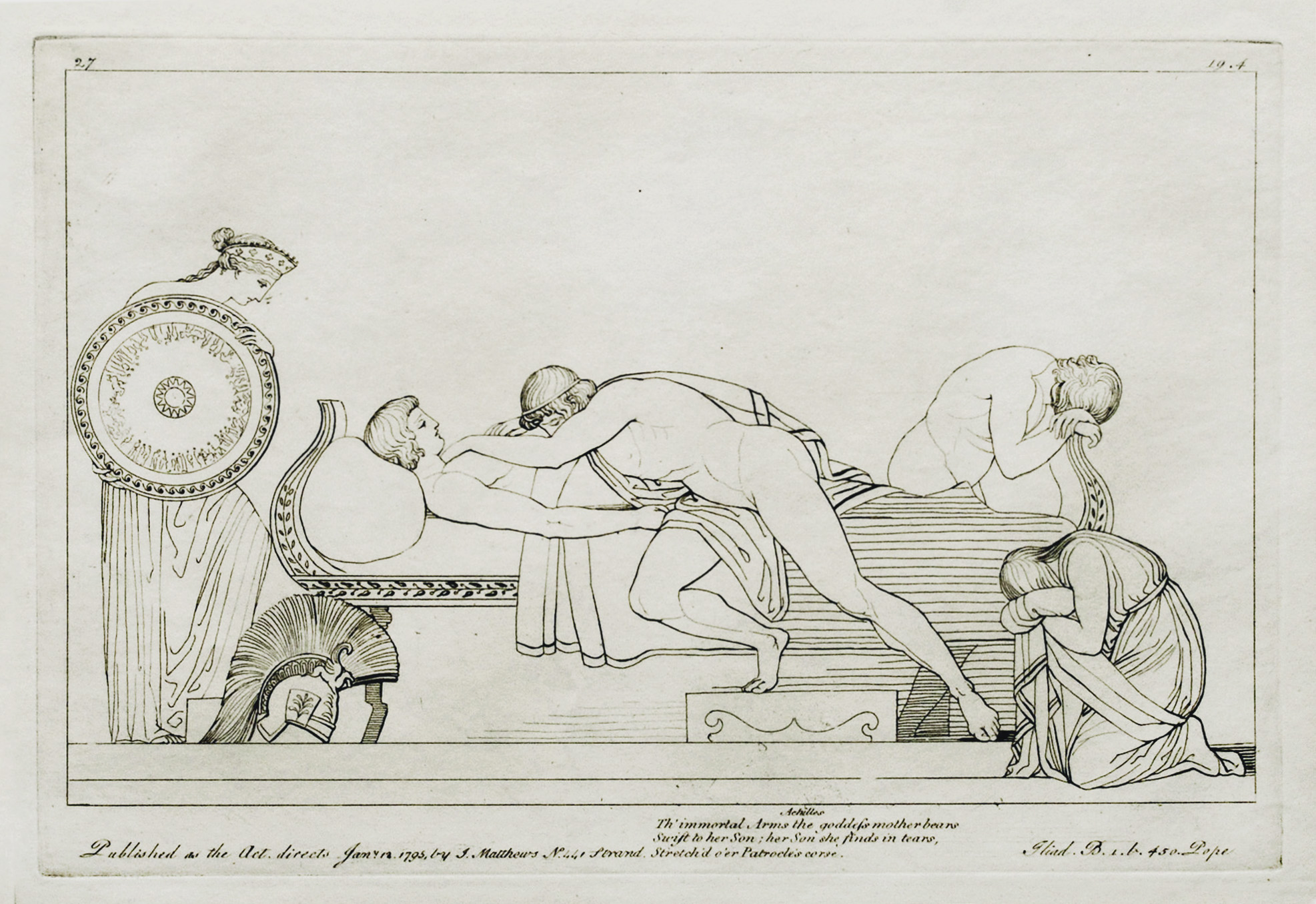
Achilles mourning Patrocles; after John Flaxman; 1795; engraving after a drawing; unknown size; unknown location

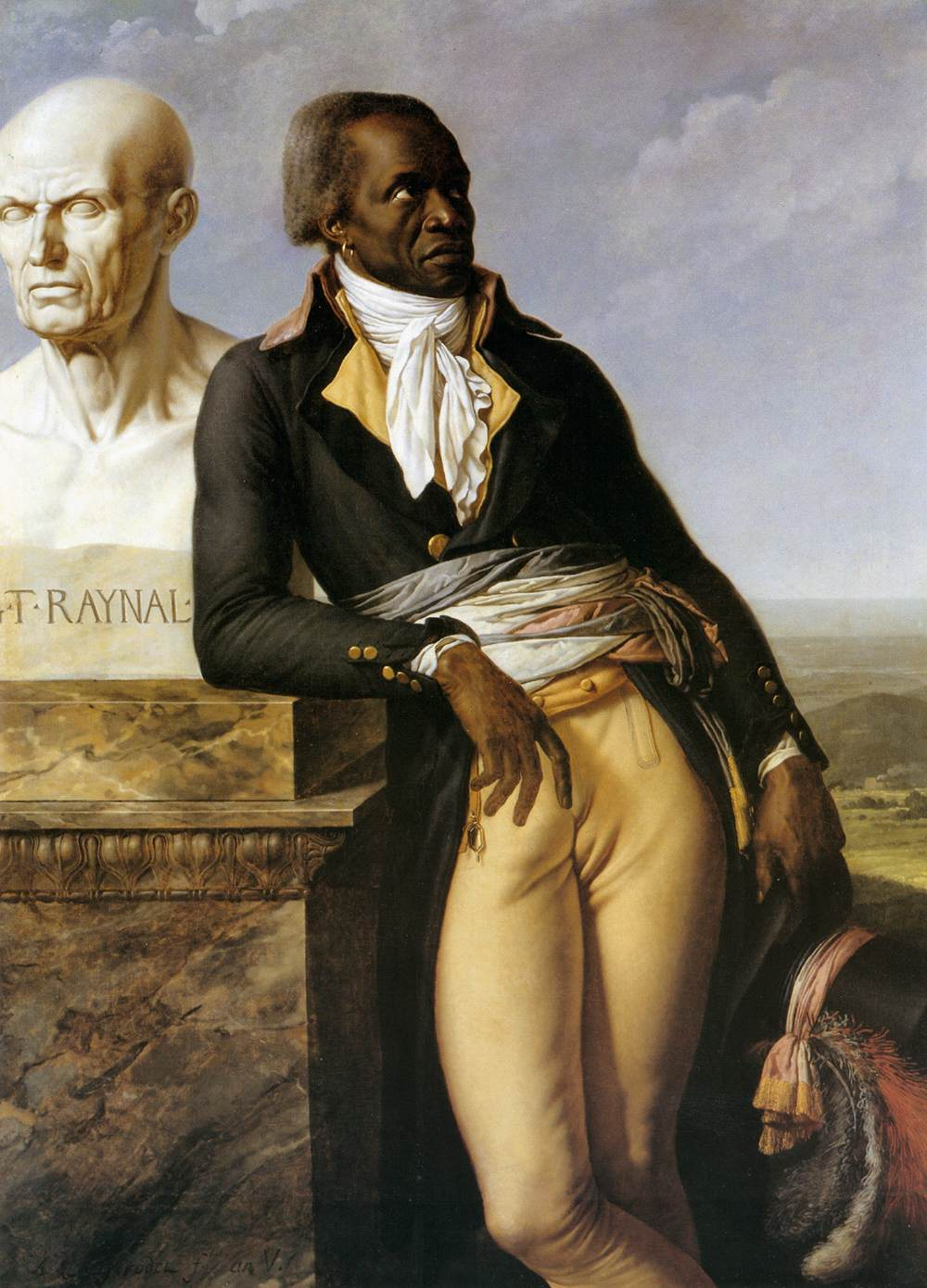
Portrait of Jean-Baptiste Belley, Ex-Representative of the Colonies; by Anne-Louis Girodet; 1796–1797; oil on canvas; 1.59 x 1.11 m; Palace of Versailles, France

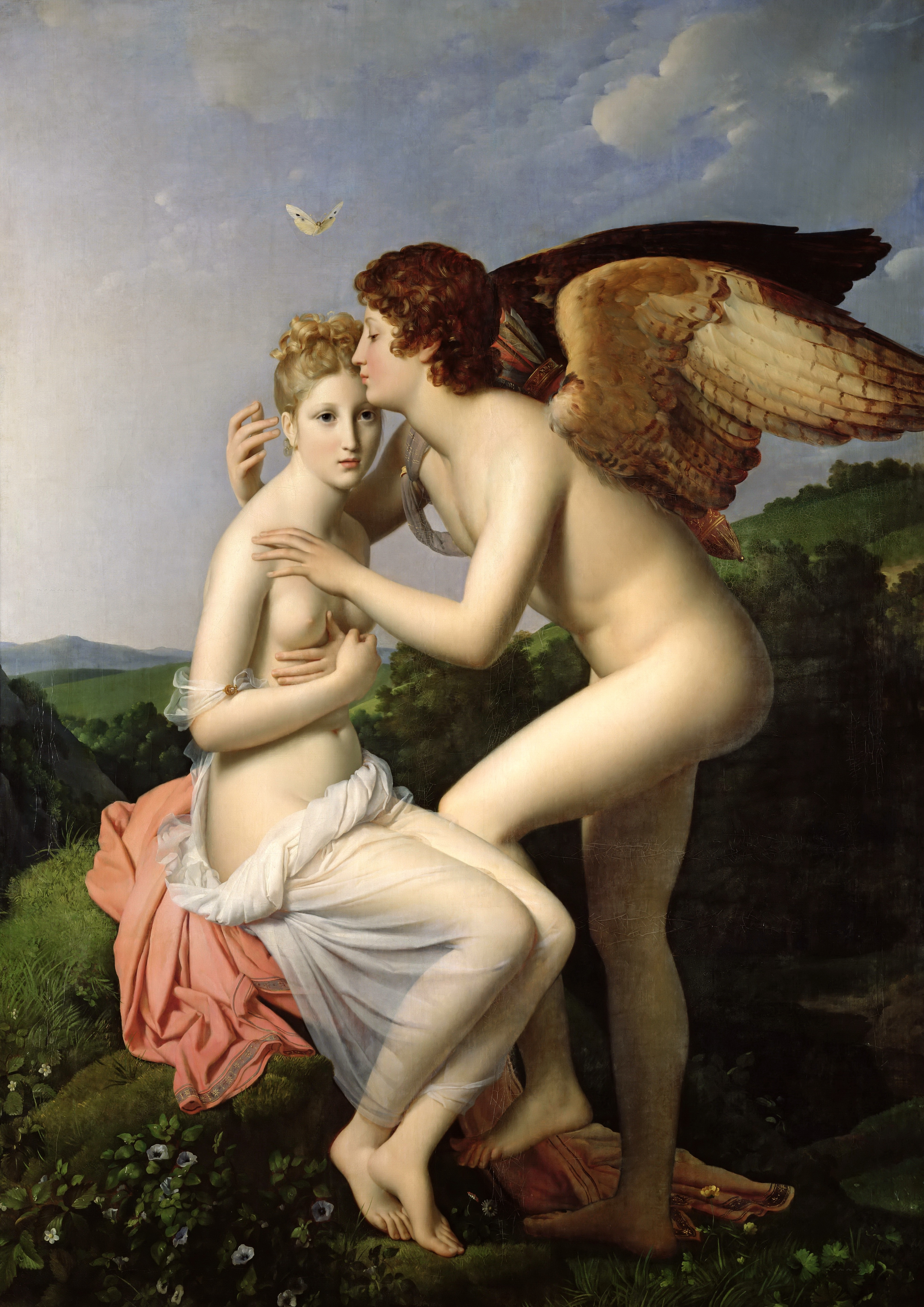
Cupid and Psyche; by François Gérard; 1798; oil on canvas; 186 x 132 cm; Louvre

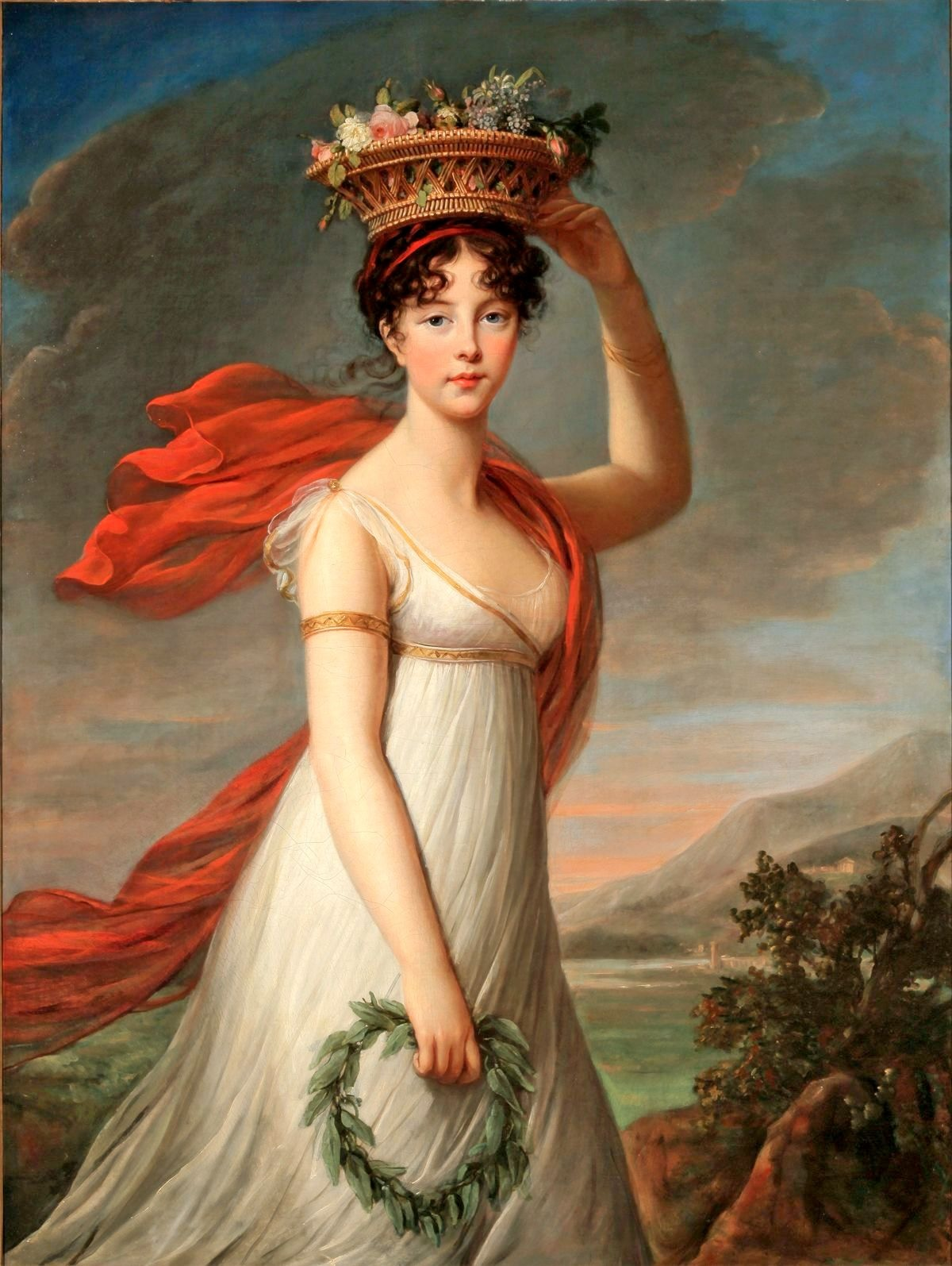
Julie Lebrun as Flora; by Élisabeth Vigée Le Brun; c.1799; oil on canvas; 129.5 x 97.8 cm; Museum of Fine Arts (St. Petersburg, Florida), US

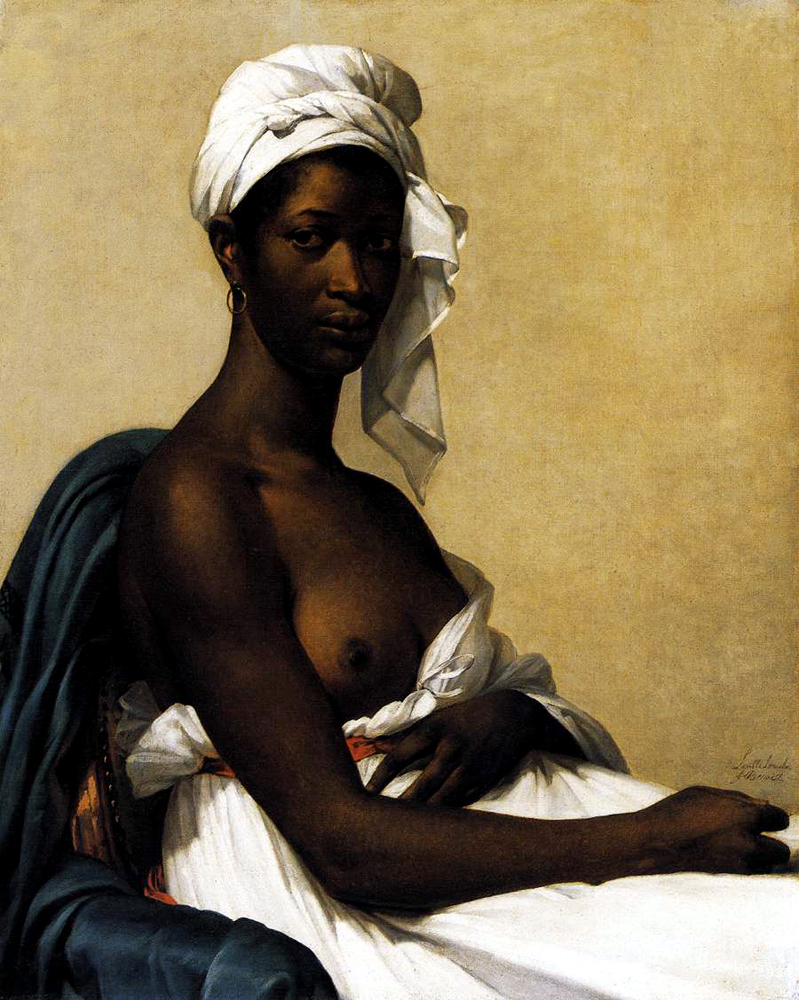
Portrait of a Black Woman, by Marie-Guillemine Benoist; 1800; oil on canvas; 81 x 65 cm; Louvre

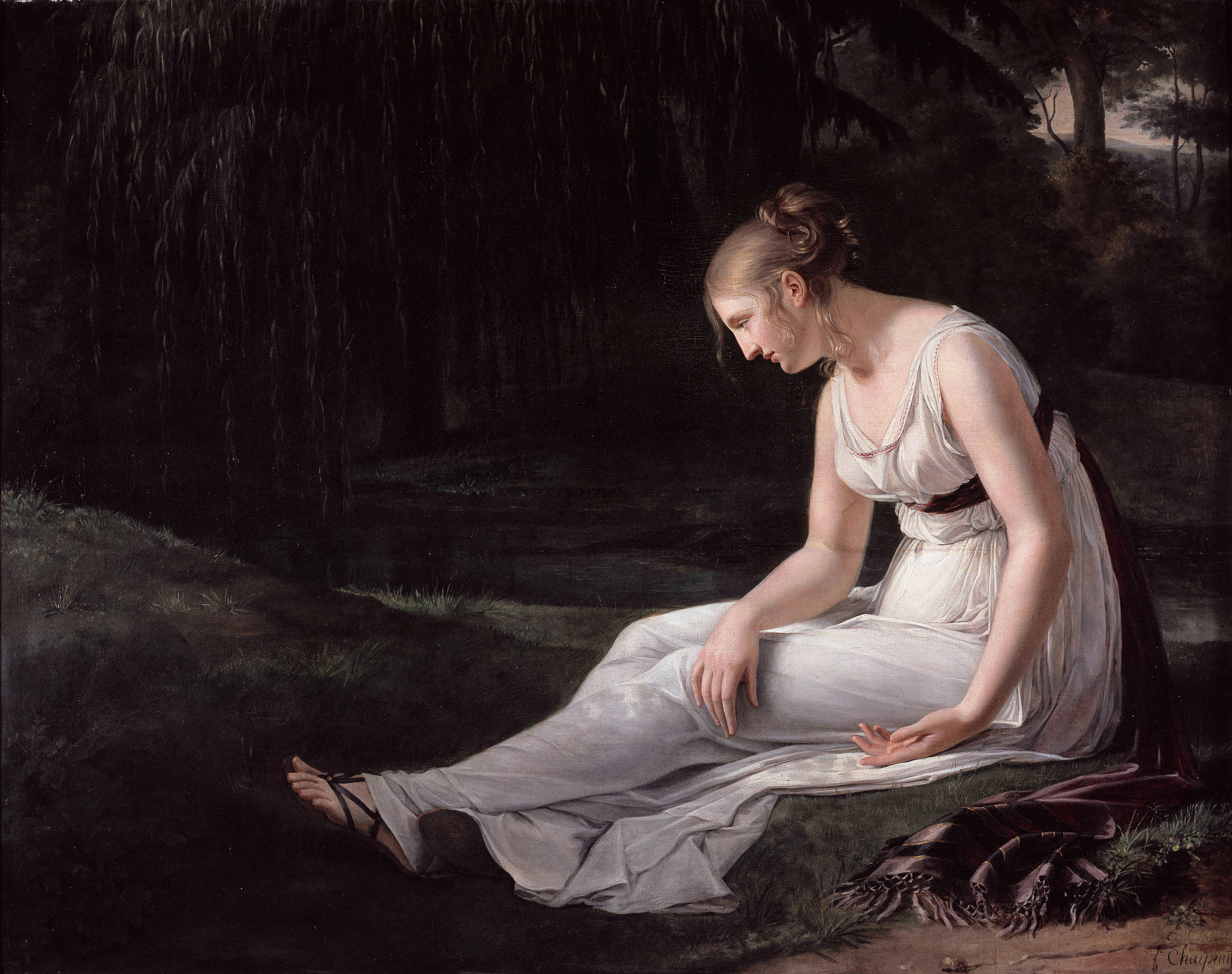
Melancholy; by Constance Marie Charpentier; 1801; oil on canvas; 130 x 165; Musée de Picardie, Amiens, France

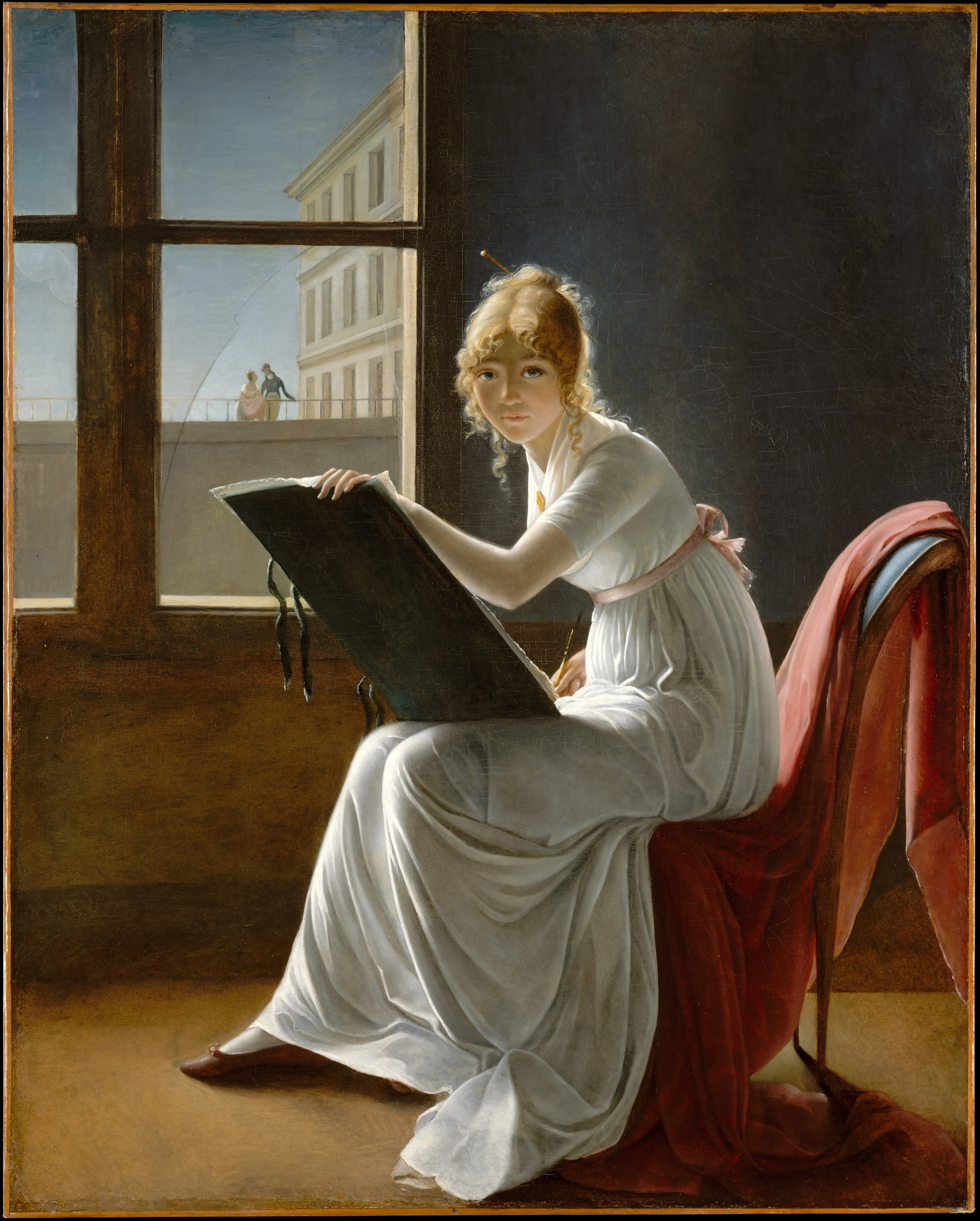
Portrait of Charlotte du Val d'Ognes; by Marie-Denise Villers; 1801; oil on canvas; 161.3 x 128.6 cm; Metropolitan Museum of Art

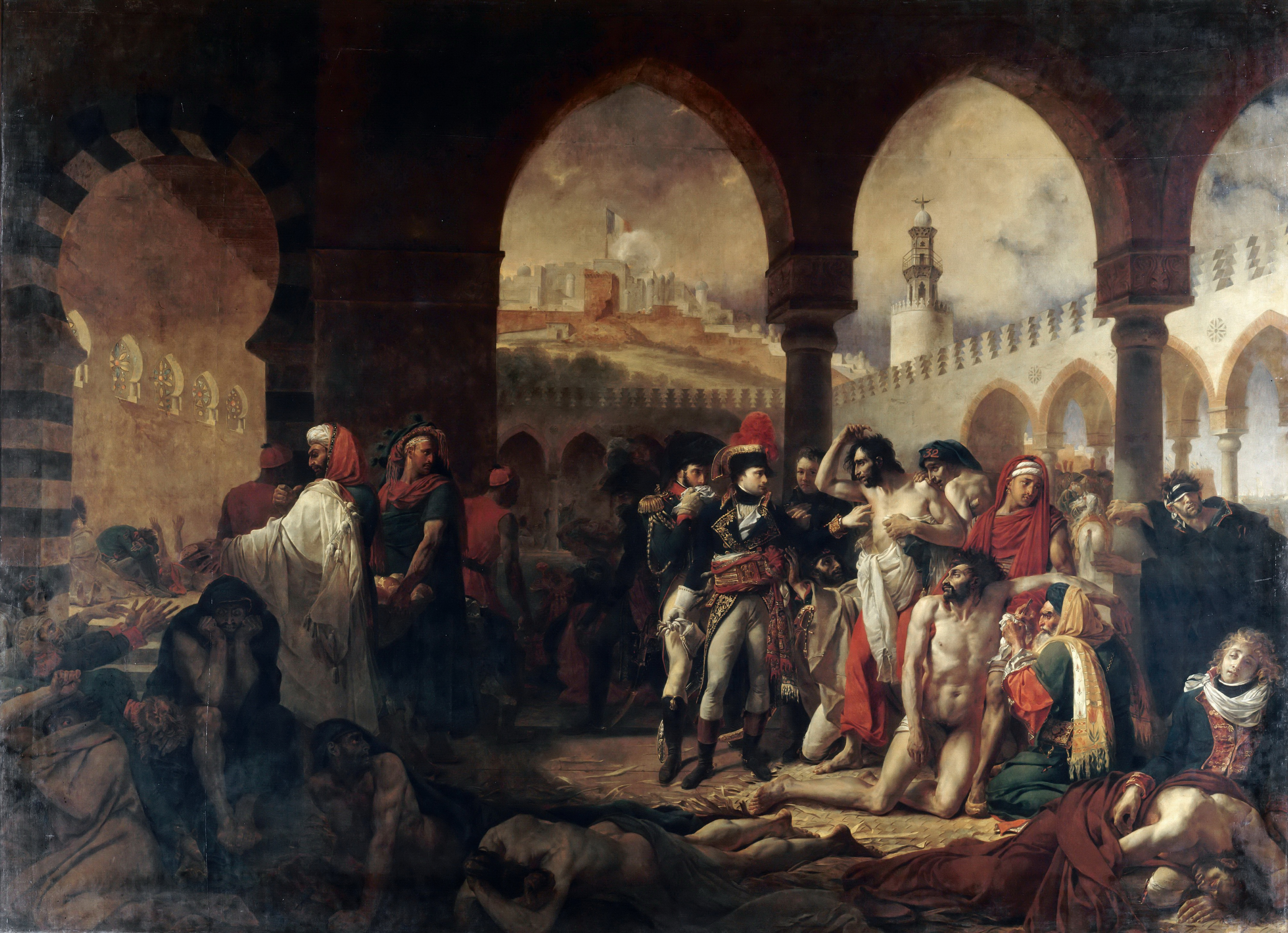
Bonaparte Visiting the Plague Victims of Jaffa; by Antoine-Jean Gros; 1804; oil on canvas; 5.2 x 7.2 m; Louvre

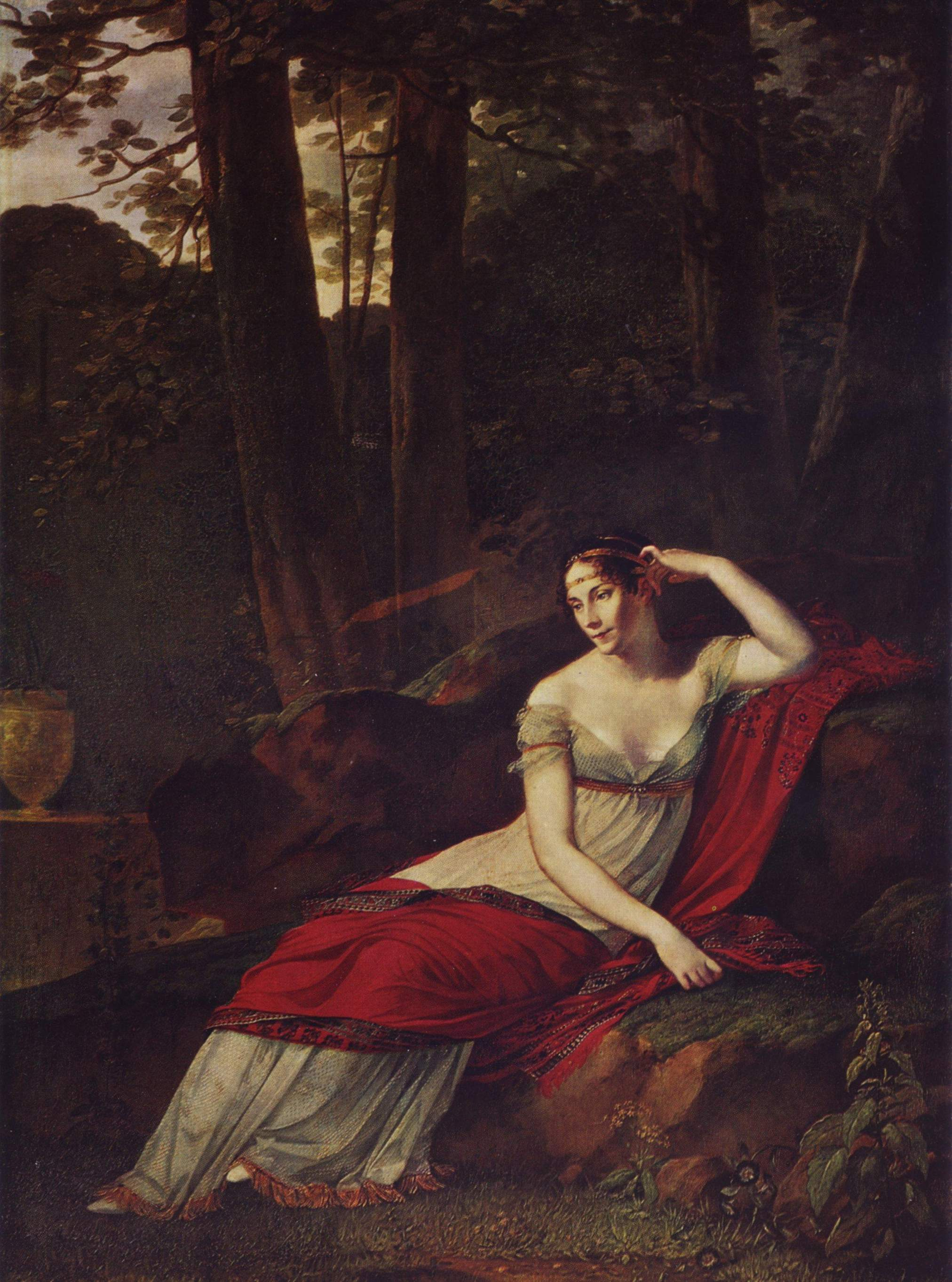
Portrait of Empress Joséphine; by Pierre-Paul Prud'hon; 1805; oil on canvas; 244 x 179 cm; Louvre

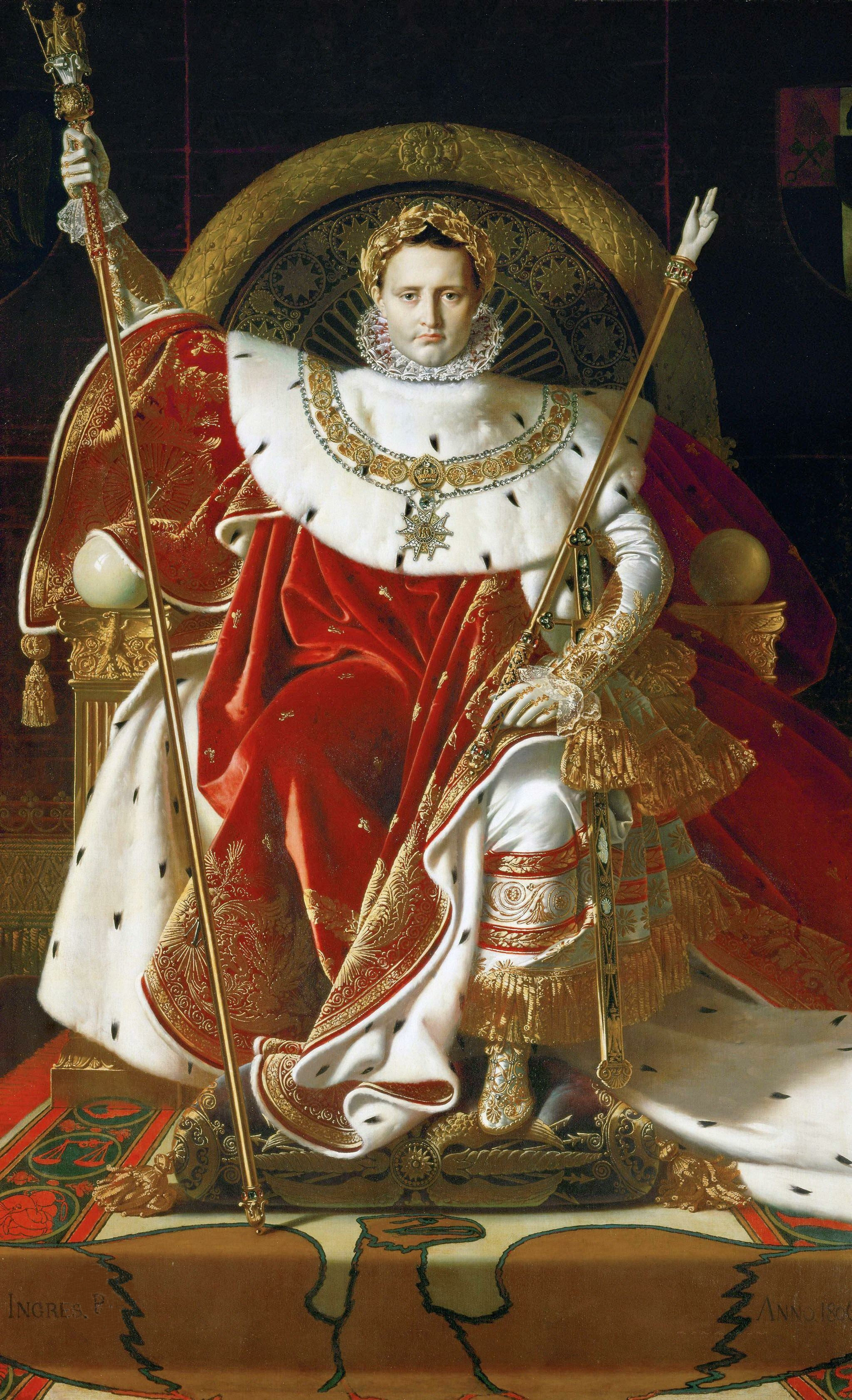
Napoleon I on His Imperial Throne; by Jean-Auguste-Dominique Ingres; 1806; oil on canvas; 2.62 x 1.62 m; Army Museum (Paris)

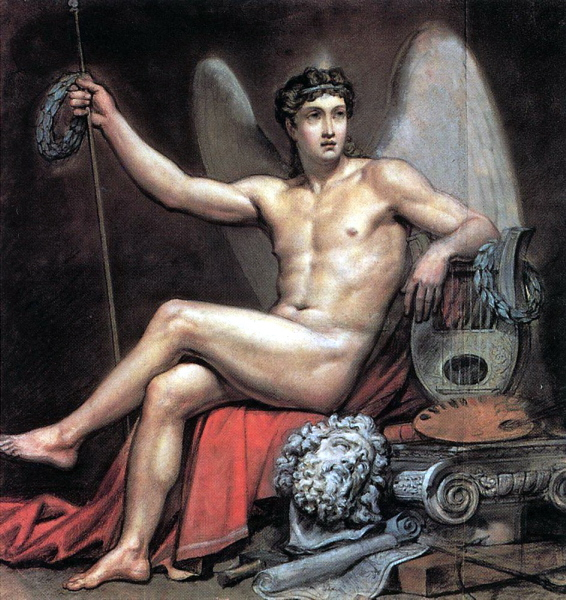
The Genius of Art; by Karl Briullov; 1819–1821; gray paper, pencil, chalk, charcoal, and pastel; 65.2 x 62.2; Russian Museum, Saint Petersburg

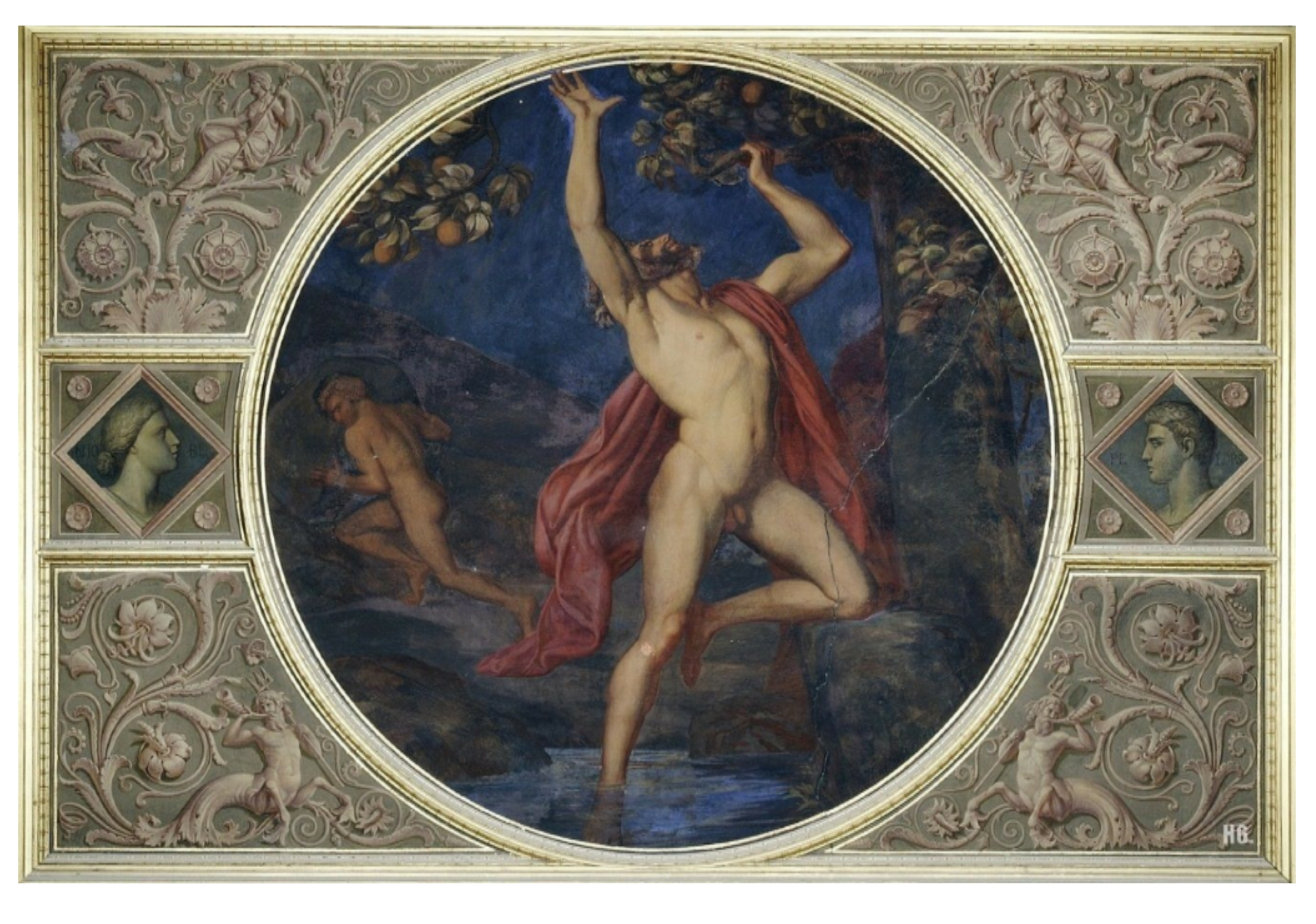
Tantalus and Sisyphus in Hades; by August Theodor Kaselowsky; c.1850; wall painting; unknown dimensions; on a wall of the Room of the Niobids, Neues Museum, Berlin

It is hard to recapture the radical and exciting nature of early Neoclassical painting for contemporary audiences; it now strikes even those writers favourably inclined to it as "insipid" and "almost entirely uninteresting to us"—some of Kenneth Clark's comments on Anton Raphael Mengs' ambitious Parnassus at the Villa Albani, by the artist whom his friend Winckelmann described as "the greatest artist of his own, and perhaps of later times". The drawings, subsequently turned into prints, of John Flaxman used very simple line drawing (thought to be the purest classical medium) and figures mostly in profile to depict The Odyssey and other subjects, and once "fired the artistic youth of Europe" but are now "neglected", while the history paintings of Angelica Kauffman, mainly a portraitist, are described as having "an unctuous softness and tediousness" by Fritz Novotny. Rococo frivolity and Baroque movement had been stripped away but many artists struggled to put anything in their place, and in the absence of ancient examples for history painting, other than the Greek vases used by Flaxman, Raphael tended to be used as a substitute model, as Winckelmann recommended.

The work of other artists, who could not easily be described as insipid, combined aspects of Romanticism with a generally Neoclassical style, and form part of the history of both movements. The German-Danish painter Asmus Jacob Carstens finished very few of the large mythological works that he planned, leaving mostly drawings and colour studies which often succeed in approaching Winckelmann's prescription of "noble simplicity and calm grandeur". Unlike Carstens' unrealized schemes, the etchings of Giovanni Battista Piranesi were numerous and profitable, and taken back by those making the Grand Tour to all parts of Europe. His main subject matter was the buildings and ruins of Rome, and he was more stimulated by the ancient than the modern. The somewhat disquieting atmosphere of many of his Vedute (views) becomes dominant in his series of 16 prints of Carceri d'invenzione ("Imaginary Prisons") whose "oppressive cyclopean architecture" conveys "dreams of fear and frustration". The Swiss-born Henry Fuseli spent most of his career in England, and while his fundamental style was based on Neoclassical principles, his subjects and treatment more often reflected the "Gothic" strain of Romanticism, and sought to evoke drama and excitement.

Neoclassicism in painting gained a new sense of direction with the sensational success of Jacques-Louis David's Oath of the Horatii at the Paris Salon of 1785. Despite its evocation of republican virtues, this was a commission by the royal government, which David insisted on painting in Rome. David managed to combine an idealist style with drama and forcefulness. The central perspective is perpendicular to the picture plane, made more emphatic by the dim arcade behind, against which the heroic figures are disposed as in a frieze, with a hint of the artificial lighting and staging of opera, and the classical colouring of Nicolas Poussin. David rapidly became the leader of French art, and after the French Revolution became a politician with control of much government patronage in art. He managed to retain his influence in the Napoleonic period, turning to frankly propagandistic works, but had to leave France for exile in Brussels at the Bourbon Restoration.

David's many students included Jean-Auguste-Dominique Ingres, who saw himself as a classicist throughout his long career, despite a mature style that has an equivocal relationship with the main current of Neoclassicism, and many later diversions into Orientalism and the Troubadour style that are hard to distinguish from those of his unabashedly Romantic contemporaries, except by the primacy his works always give to drawing. He exhibited at the Salon for over 60 years, from 1802 into the beginnings of Impressionism, but his style, once formed, changed little.

== Sculpture ==
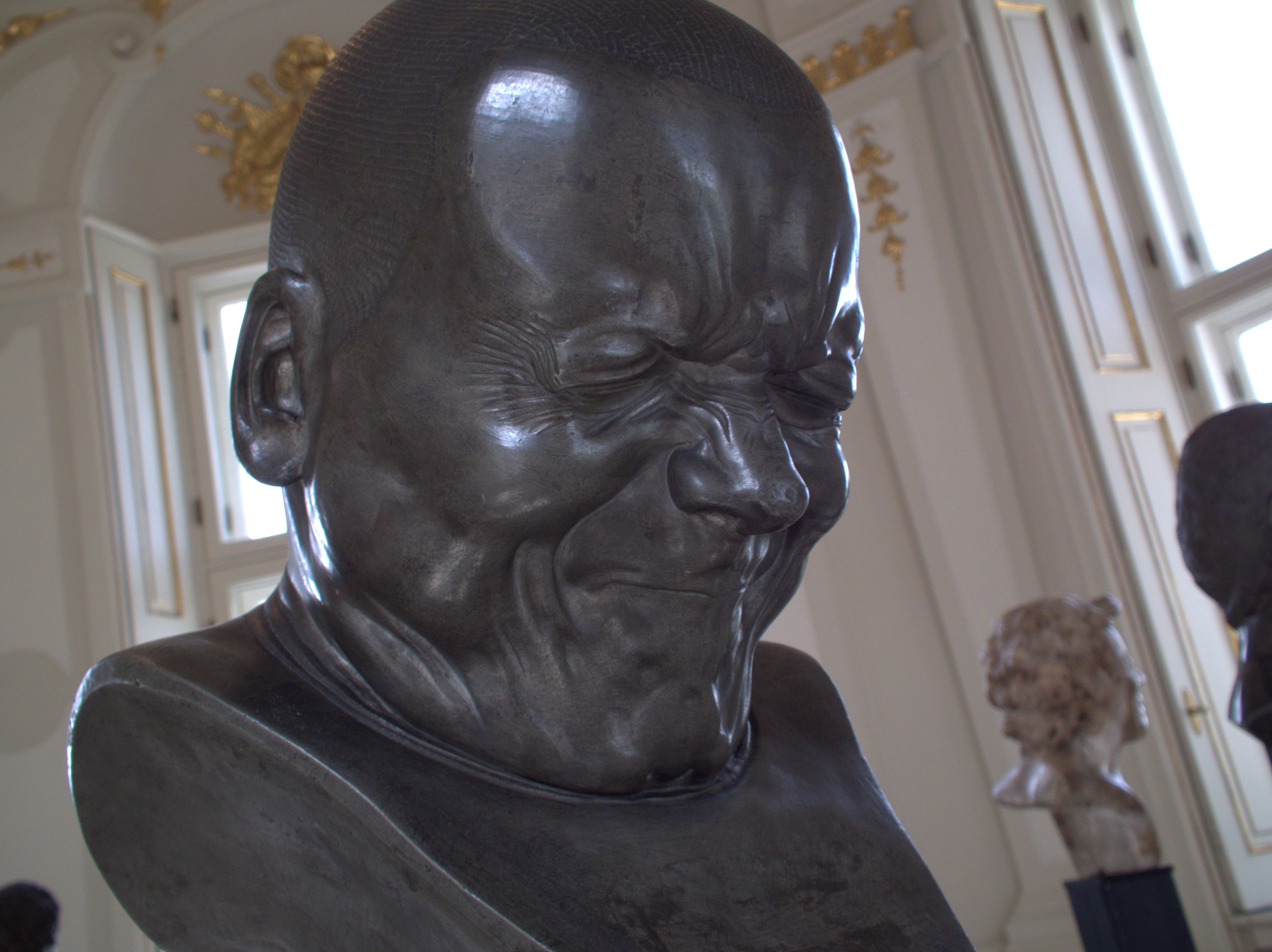
An Arch-Rascal (no. 33 in a character head series); by Franz Xaver Messerschmidt; after 1770; alabaster; height: 38 cm; Österreichische Galerie Belvedere, Vienna, Austria

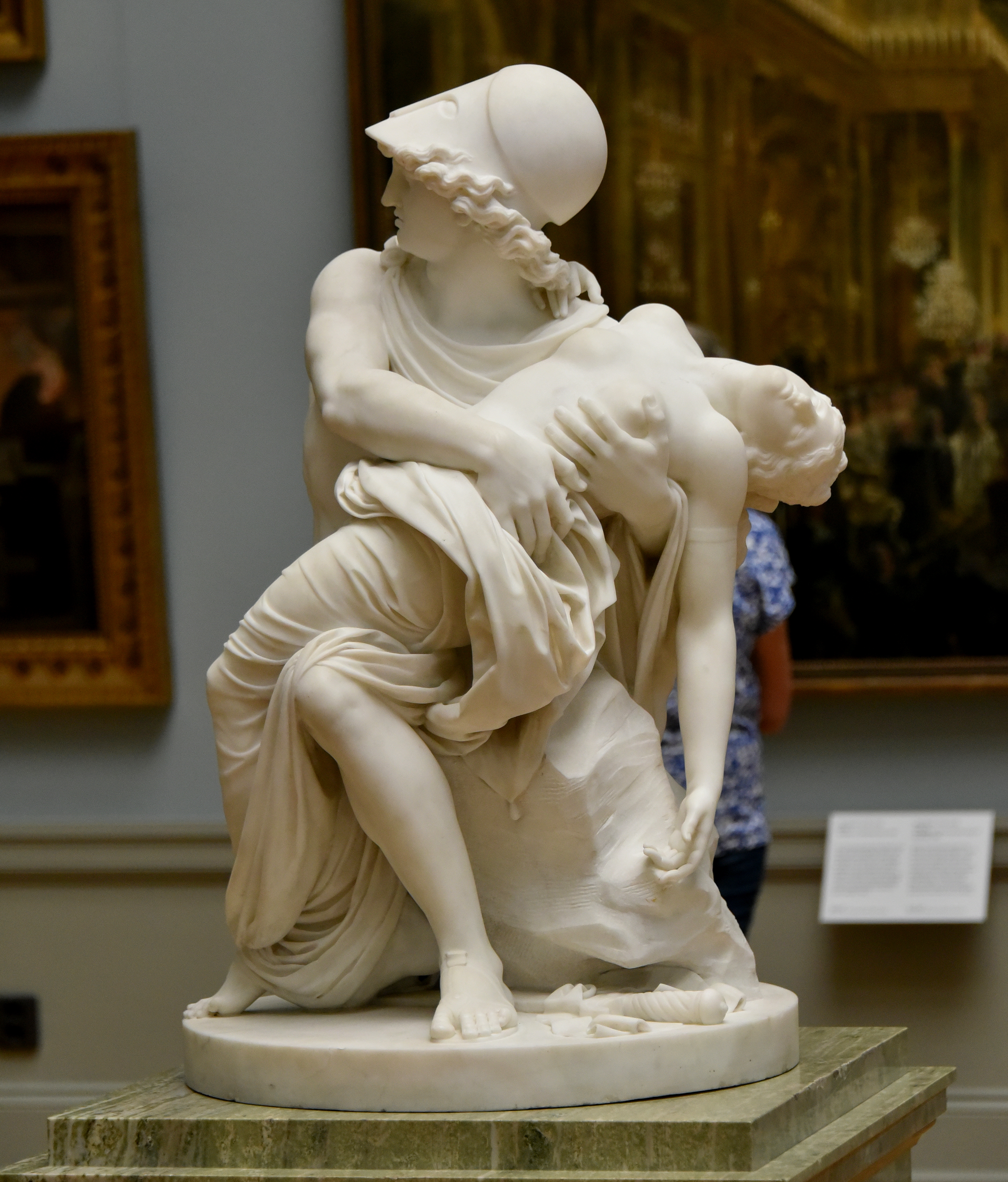
Mars and Venus; by Johan Tobias Sergel; c.1775; marble; height: 93 cm; Nationalmuseum, Stockholm, Sweden

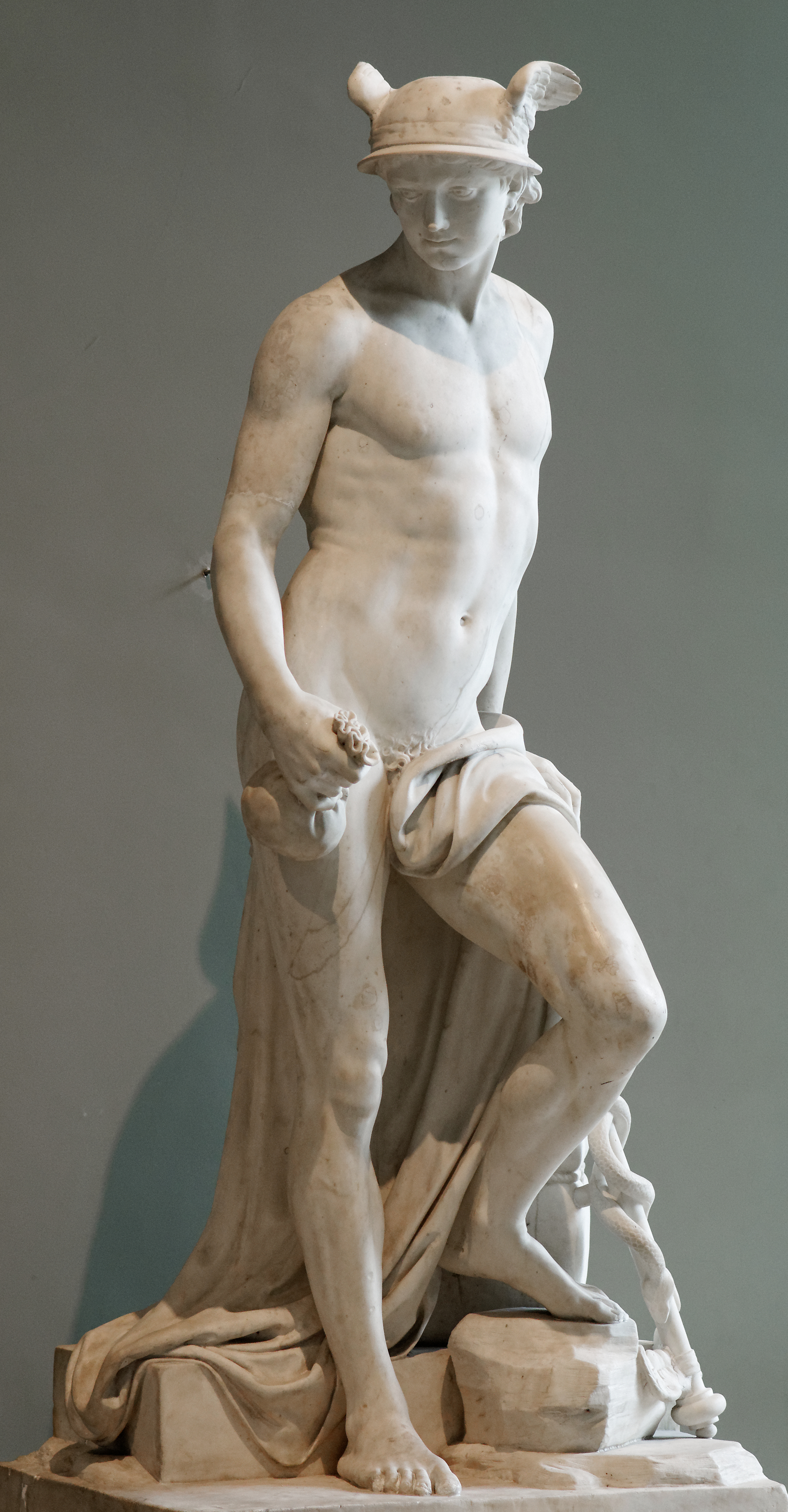
Mercury or The Trade; by Augustin Pajou; 1780; marble; height: 196 cm; Louvre

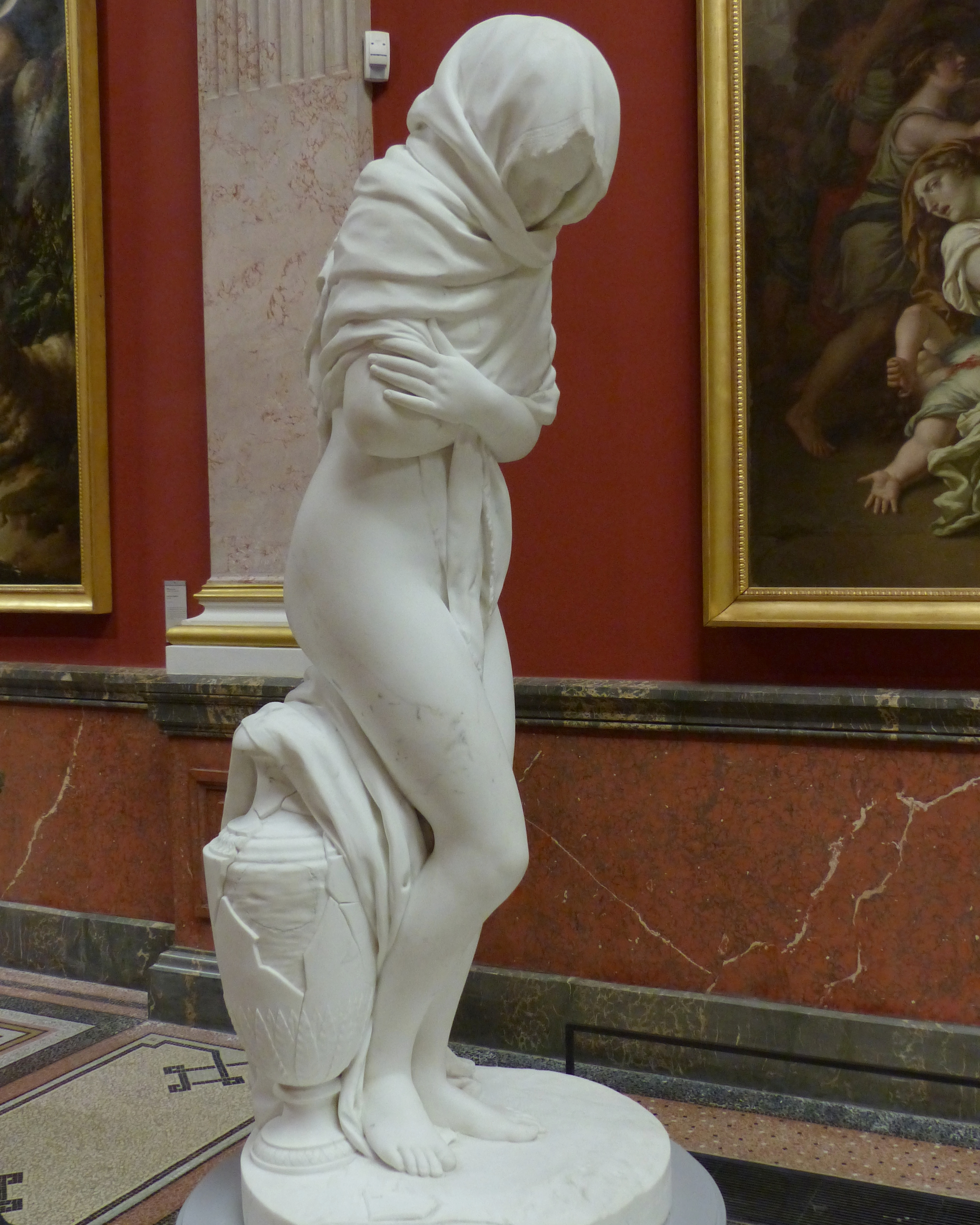
The Winter; by Jean-Antoine Houdon; 1783; marble; height: 145 cm; Musée Fabre, Montpellier, France

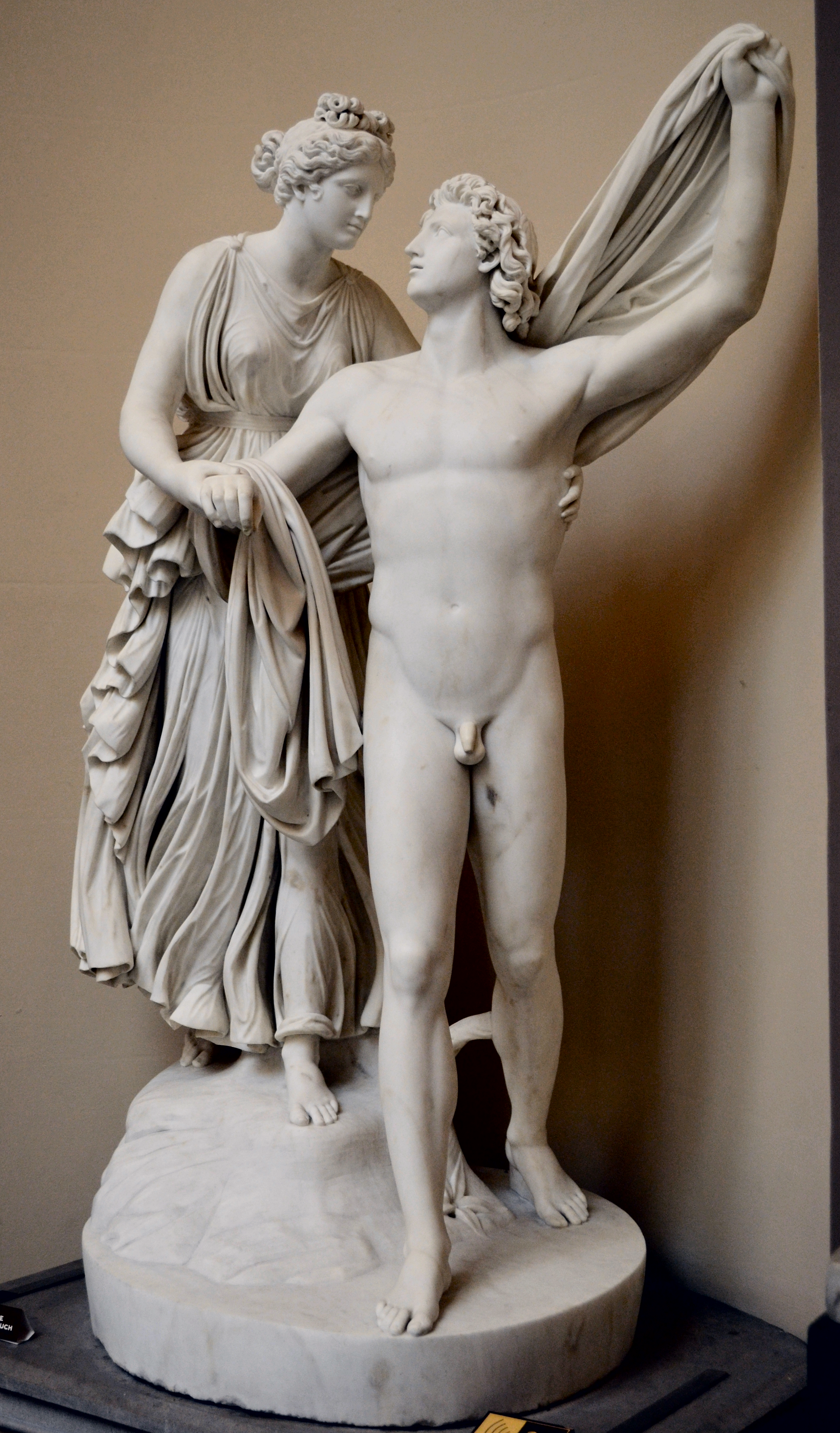
Cephalus and Aurora; by John Flaxman; 1789–1790; probably marble; unknown dimensions; Lady Lever Art Gallery, Merseyside, England

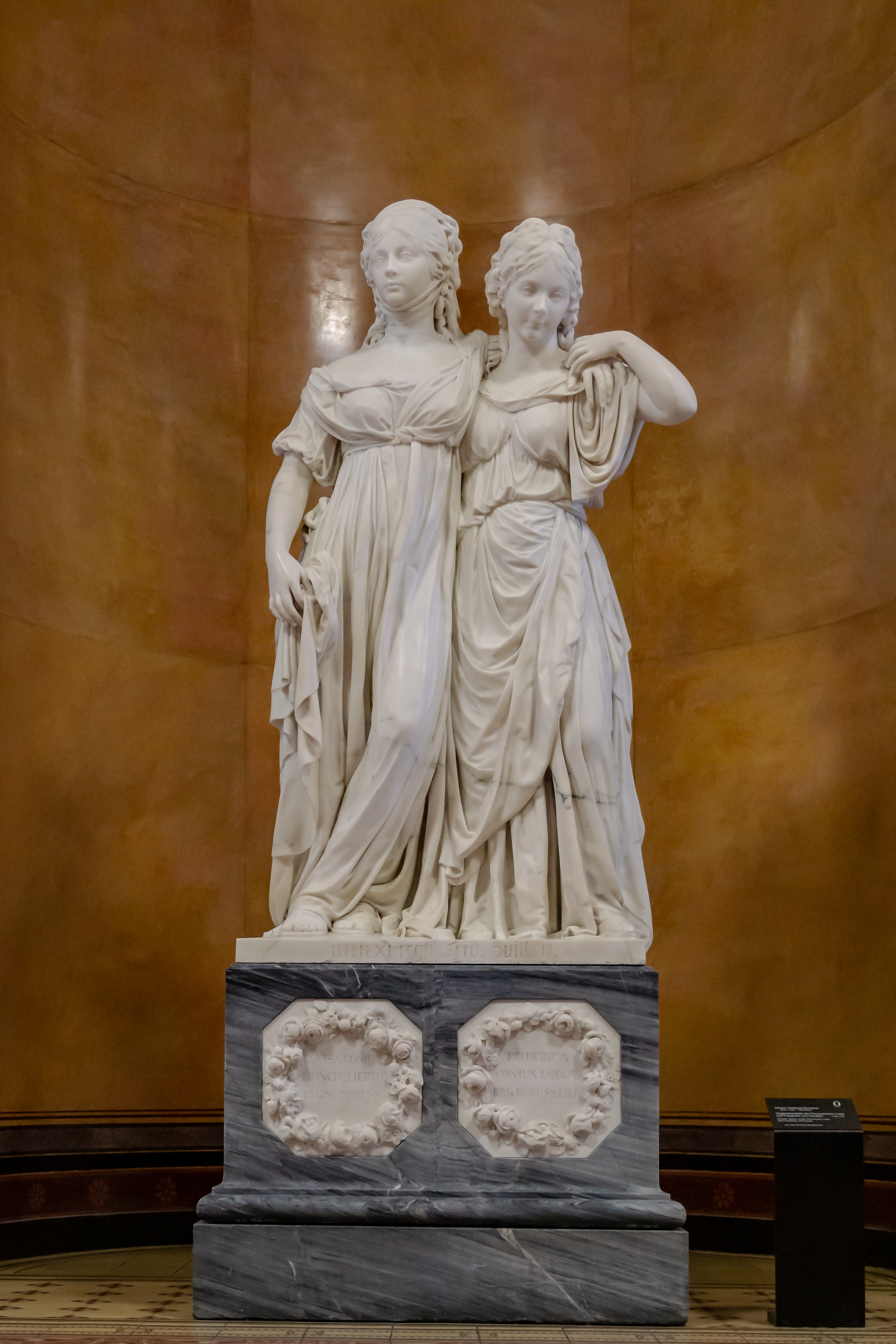
The Princesses Louisa and Friderica of Prussia; by Johann Gottfried Schadow; 1795–1797; marble; height: 172 cm; Alte Nationalgalerie, Berlin, Germany

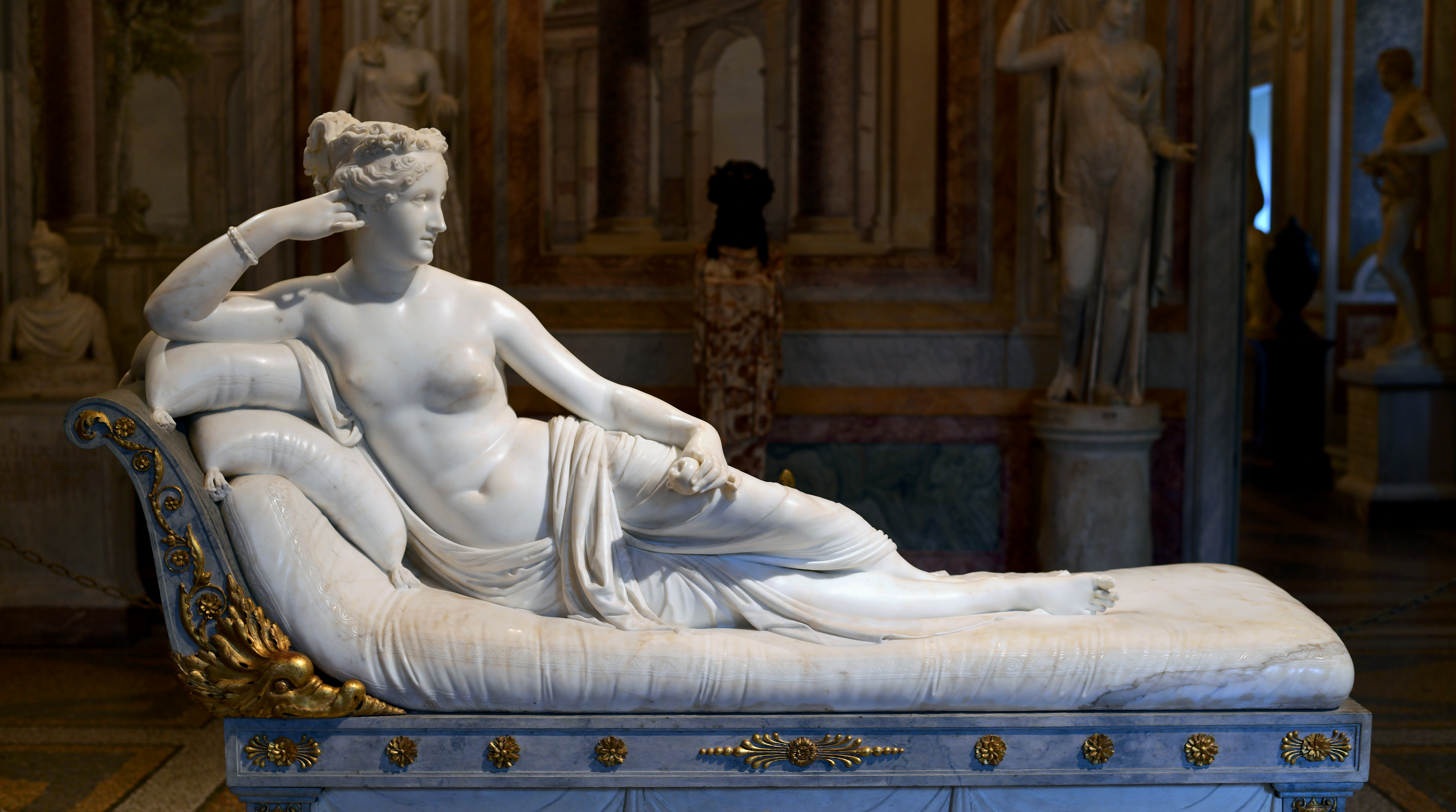
Venus Victrix; by Antonio Canova; 1804–1808; marble; length: 200 cm; Galleria Borghese, Rome

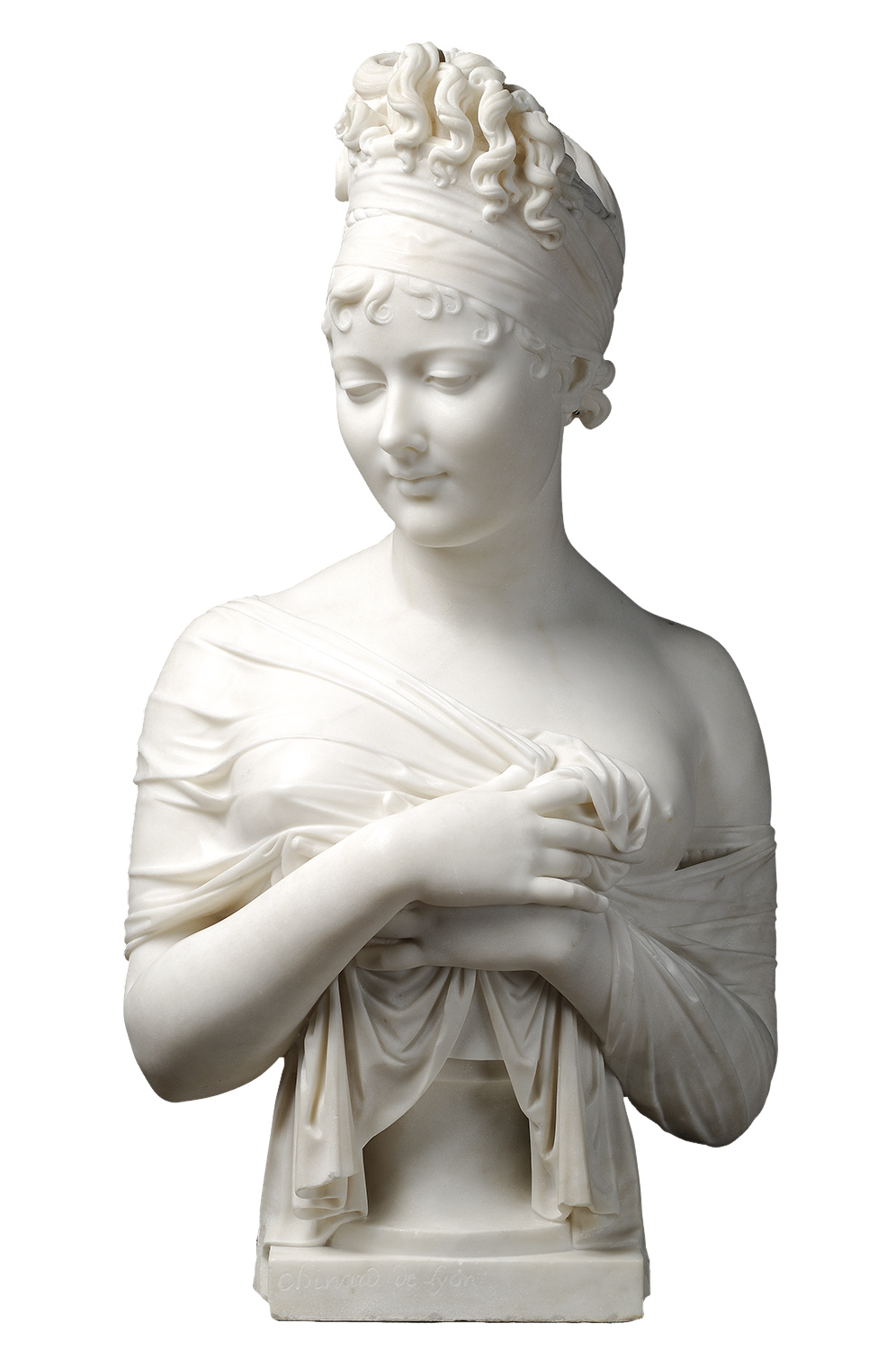
Bust of Madame Récamier; by Joseph Chinard; 1805 or 1806; marble; 80 x 42 x 30 cm; Museum of Fine Arts of Lyon, France

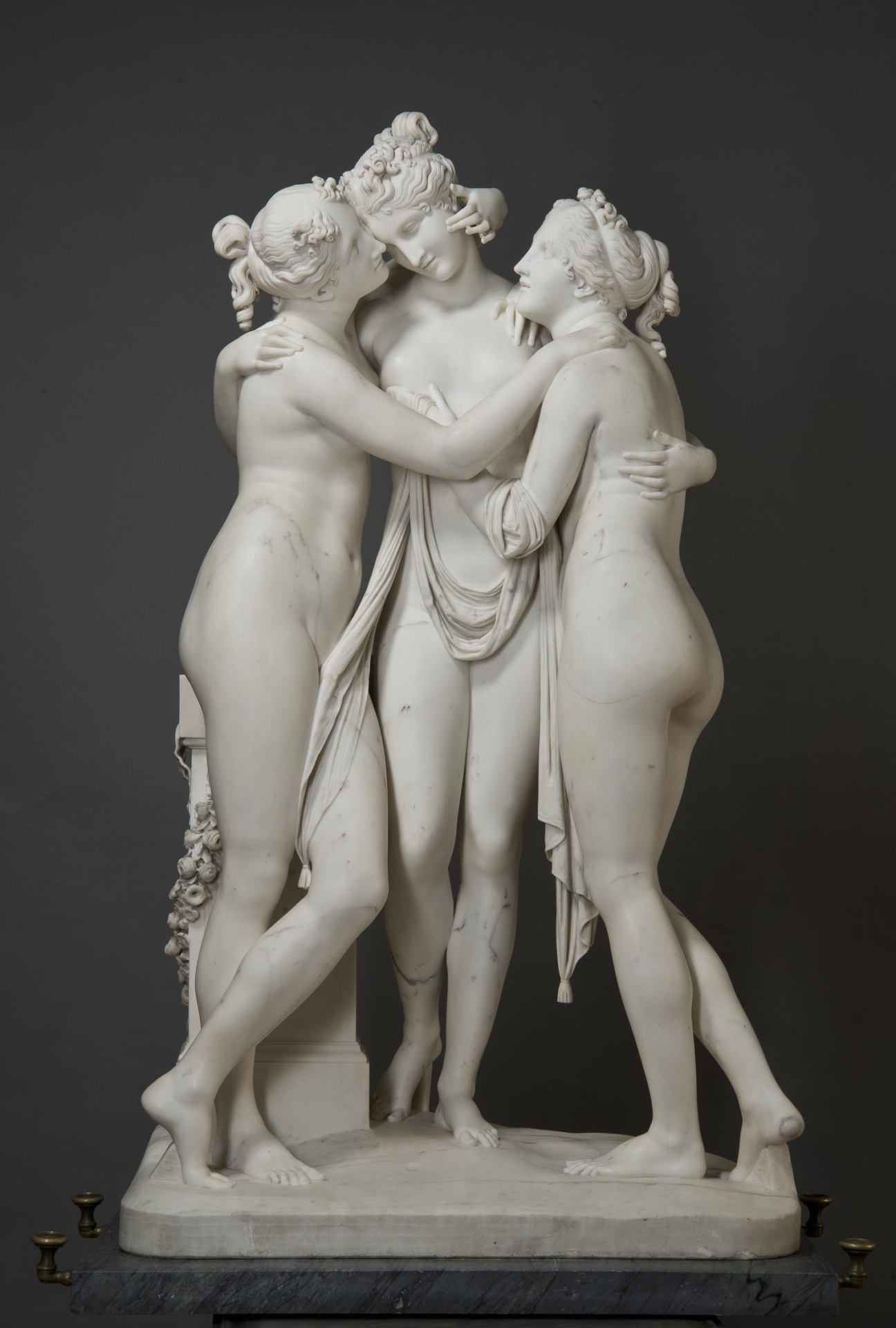
The Three Graces; by Antonio Canova; 1813–1816; marble; height: 1.82 m; Hermitage Museum, Saint Petersburg, Russia

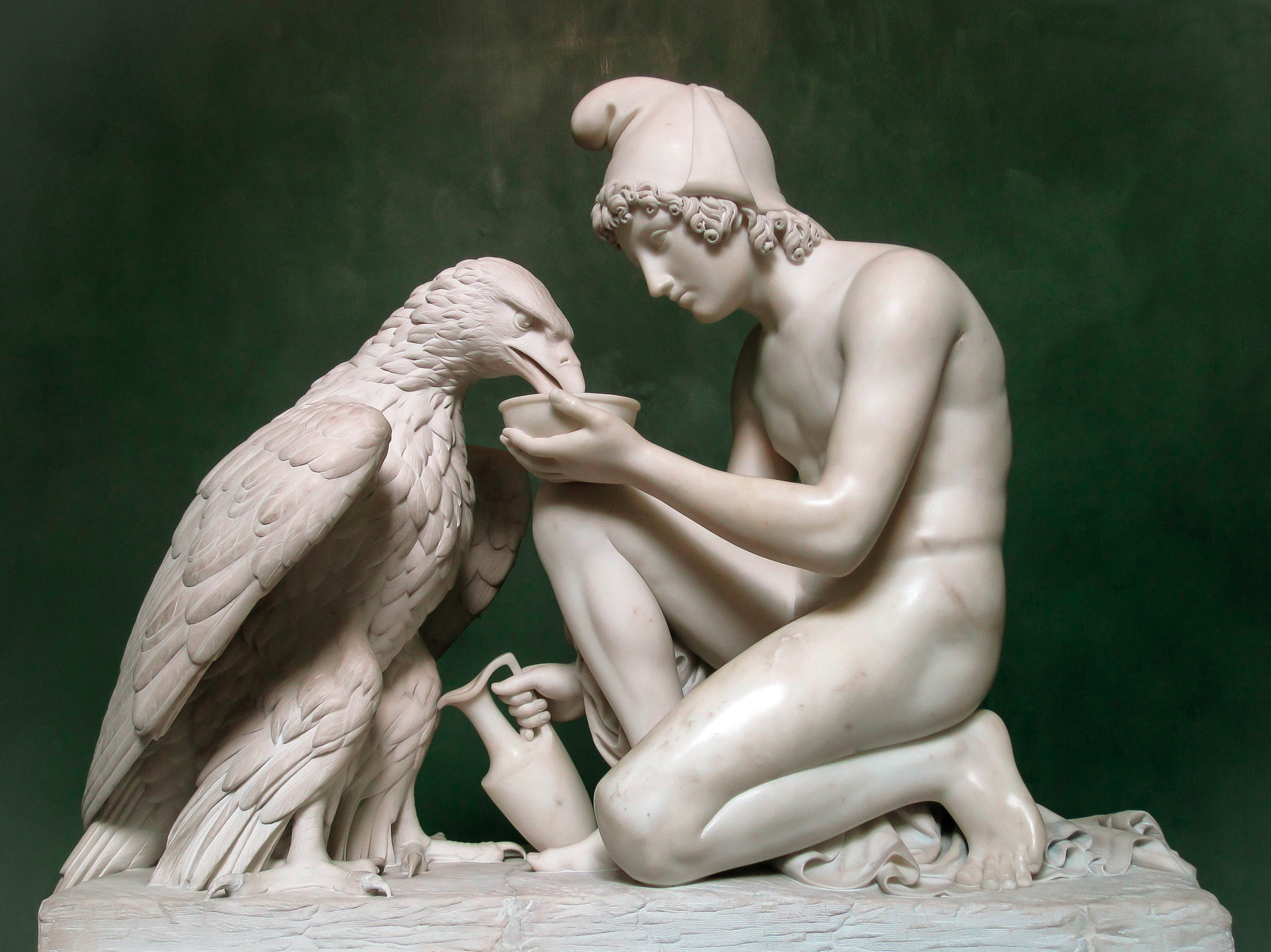
Ganymede and Jupiter; by Bertel Thorvaldsen; 1817; marble; height: 94 cm; Thorvaldsen Museum, Copenhagen, Denmark

If Neoclassical painting suffered from a lack of ancient models, Neoclassical sculpture tended to suffer from an excess of them. Although examples of actual Greek sculpture of the "Classical Period" beginning in about 500 BC were then very few; the most highly regarded works were mostly Roman copies. The leading Neoclassical sculptors enjoyed huge reputations in their own day, but are now less regarded, with the exception of Jean-Antoine Houdon, whose work was mainly portraits, very often as busts, which do not sacrifice a strong impression of the sitter's personality to idealism. His style became more classical as his long career continued, and represents a rather smooth progression from Rococo charm to classical dignity. Unlike some Neoclassical sculptors he did not insist on his sitters wearing Roman dress, or being unclothed. He portrayed most of the notable figures of the Enlightenment, and travelled to America to produce a statue of George Washington, as well as busts of Thomas Jefferson, Benjamin Franklin and other founders of the new republic.

Antonio Canova and the Dane Bertel Thorvaldsen were both based in Rome, and as well as portraits produced many ambitious life-size figures and groups; both represented the strongly idealizing tendency in Neoclassical sculpture. Canova has a lightness and grace, where Thorvaldsen is more severe; the difference is exemplified in their respective groups of the Three Graces. All these, and Flaxman, were still active in the 1820s, and Romanticism was slow to impact sculpture, where versions of Neoclassicism remained the dominant style for most of the 19th century.

An early Neoclassicist in sculpture was the Swede Johan Tobias Sergel. John Flaxman was also, or mainly, a sculptor, mostly producing severely classical reliefs that are comparable in style to his prints; he also designed and modelled Neoclassical ceramics for Josiah Wedgwood for several years. Johann Gottfried Schadow and his son Rudolph, one of the few Neoclassical sculptors to die young, were the leading German artists, with Franz Anton von Zauner in Austria. The late Baroque Austrian sculptor Franz Xaver Messerschmidt turned to Neoclassicism in mid-career, shortly before he appears to have suffered some kind of mental crisis, after which he retired to the country and devoted himself to the highly distinctive "character heads" of bald figures pulling extreme facial expressions. Like Piranesi's Carceri, these enjoyed a great revival of interest during the age of psychoanalysis in the early 20th century. The Dutch Neoclassical sculptor Mathieu Kessels studied with Thorvaldsen and worked almost exclusively in Rome.

Since prior to the 1830s the United States did not have a sculpture tradition of its own, save in the areas of tombstones, weathervanes and ship figureheads, the European Neoclassical manner was adopted there, and it was to hold sway for decades and is exemplified in the sculptures of Horatio Greenough, Harriet Hosmer, Hiram Powers, Randolph Rogers and William Henry Rinehart.

== Architecture and the decorative arts ==
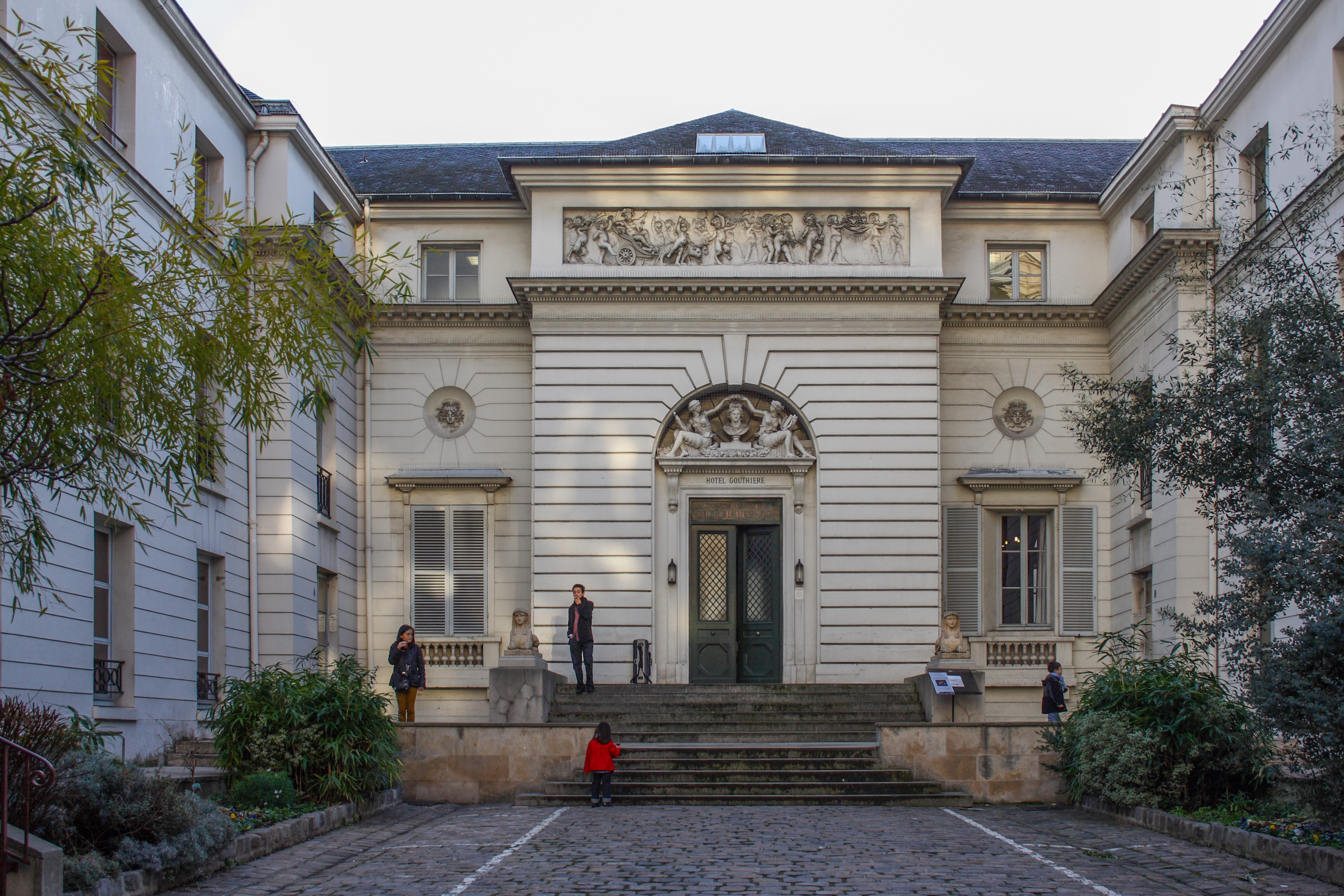
Hôtel Gouthière, Rue Pierre-Bullet no. 6, Paris, possibly by J. Métivier, 1780

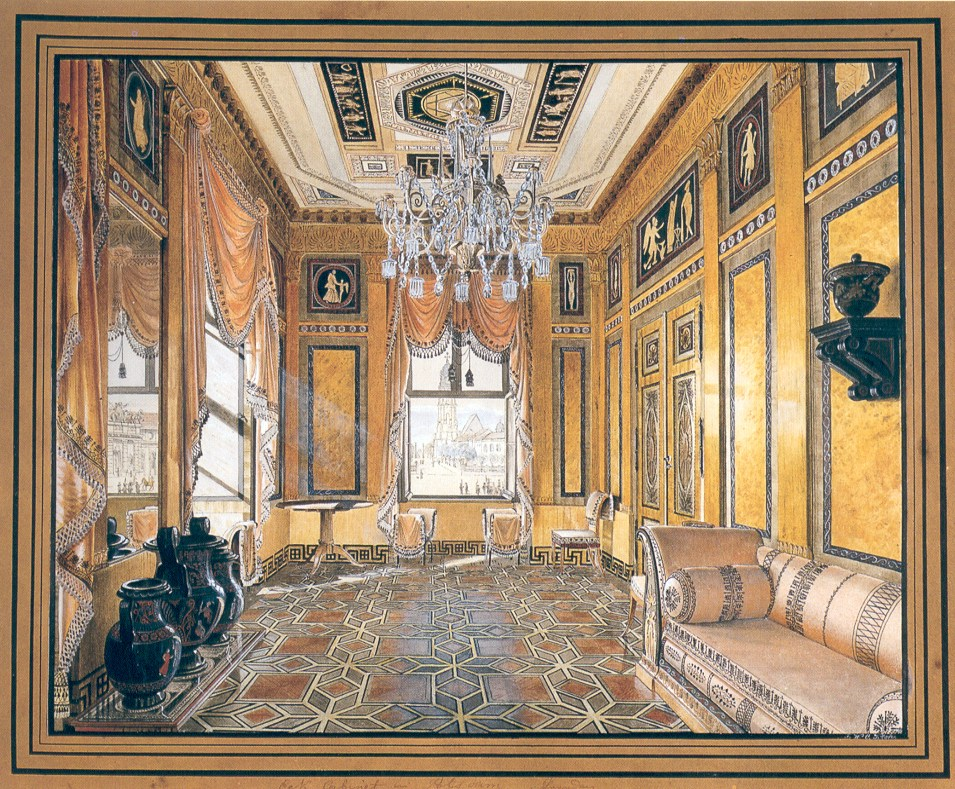
"The Etruscan room", from Potsdam, Germany, c.1840, illustration by Friedrich Wilhelm Klose

Neoclassical art was traditional and new, historical and modern, conservative and progressive all at the same time.

Neoclassicism first gained influence in Britain and France, through a generation of French art students trained in Rome and influenced by the writings of Winckelmann, and it was quickly adopted by progressive circles in other countries such as Sweden, Poland and Russia. At first, classicizing decor was grafted onto familiar European forms, as in the interiors for Catherine the Great's lover, Count Grigory Orlov, designed by an Italian architect with a team of Italian stuccadori: only the isolated oval medallions like cameos and the bas-relief overdoors hint of Neoclassicism; the furnishings are fully Italian Rococo.

A second Neoclassic wave, more severe, more studied (through the medium of engravings) and more consciously archaeological, is associated with the height of the Napoleonic Empire. In France, the first phase of Neoclassicism was expressed in the "Louis XVI style", and the second in the styles called "Directoire" and Empire. The Rococo style remained popular in Italy until the Napoleonic regimes brought the new archaeological classicism, which was embraced as a political statement by young, progressive, urban Italians with republican leanings.

In the decorative arts, Neoclassicism is exemplified in Empire furniture made in Paris, London, New York, Berlin; in Biedermeier furniture made in Austria; in Karl Friedrich Schinkel's museums in Berlin, Sir John Soane's Bank of England in London and the newly built "United States Capitol" in Washington, D.C.; and in Josiah Wedgwood's bas reliefs and "black basaltes" vases. The style was international; Scots architect Charles Cameron created palatial Italianate interiors for the German-born Catherine the Great, in St. Petersburg, Russia.

Indoors, Neoclassicism made a discovery of the genuine classic interior, inspired by the rediscoveries at Pompeii and Herculaneum. These had begun in the late 1740s, but only achieved a wide audience in the 1760s, with the first luxurious volumes of tightly controlled distribution of Le Antichità di Ercolano (The Antiquities of Herculaneum). The antiquities of Herculaneum showed that even the most classicizing interiors of the Baroque, or the most "Roman" rooms of William Kent were based on basilica and temple exterior architecture turned outside in, hence their often bombastic appearance to modern eyes: pedimented window frames turned into gilded mirrors, fireplaces topped with temple fronts. The new interiors sought to recreate an authentically Roman and genuinely interior vocabulary.

Techniques employed in the style included flatter, lighter motifs, sculpted in low frieze-like relief or painted in monotones en camaïeu ("like cameos"), isolated medallions or vases or busts or bucrania or other motifs, suspended on swags of laurel or ribbon, with slender arabesques against backgrounds, perhaps, of "Pompeiian red" or pale tints, or stone colors. The style in France was initially a Parisian style, the Goût grec ("Greek style"), not a court style; when Louis XVI acceded to the throne in 1774, Marie Antoinette, his fashion-loving Queen, brought the Louis XVI style to court. However, there was no real attempt to employ the basic forms of Roman furniture until around the transition into the 19th century, and furniture-makers were more likely to borrow from ancient architecture, just as silversmiths were more likely to take from ancient pottery and stone-carving than metalwork: "Designers and craftsmen ... seem to have taken an almost perverse pleasure in transferring motifs from one medium to another".

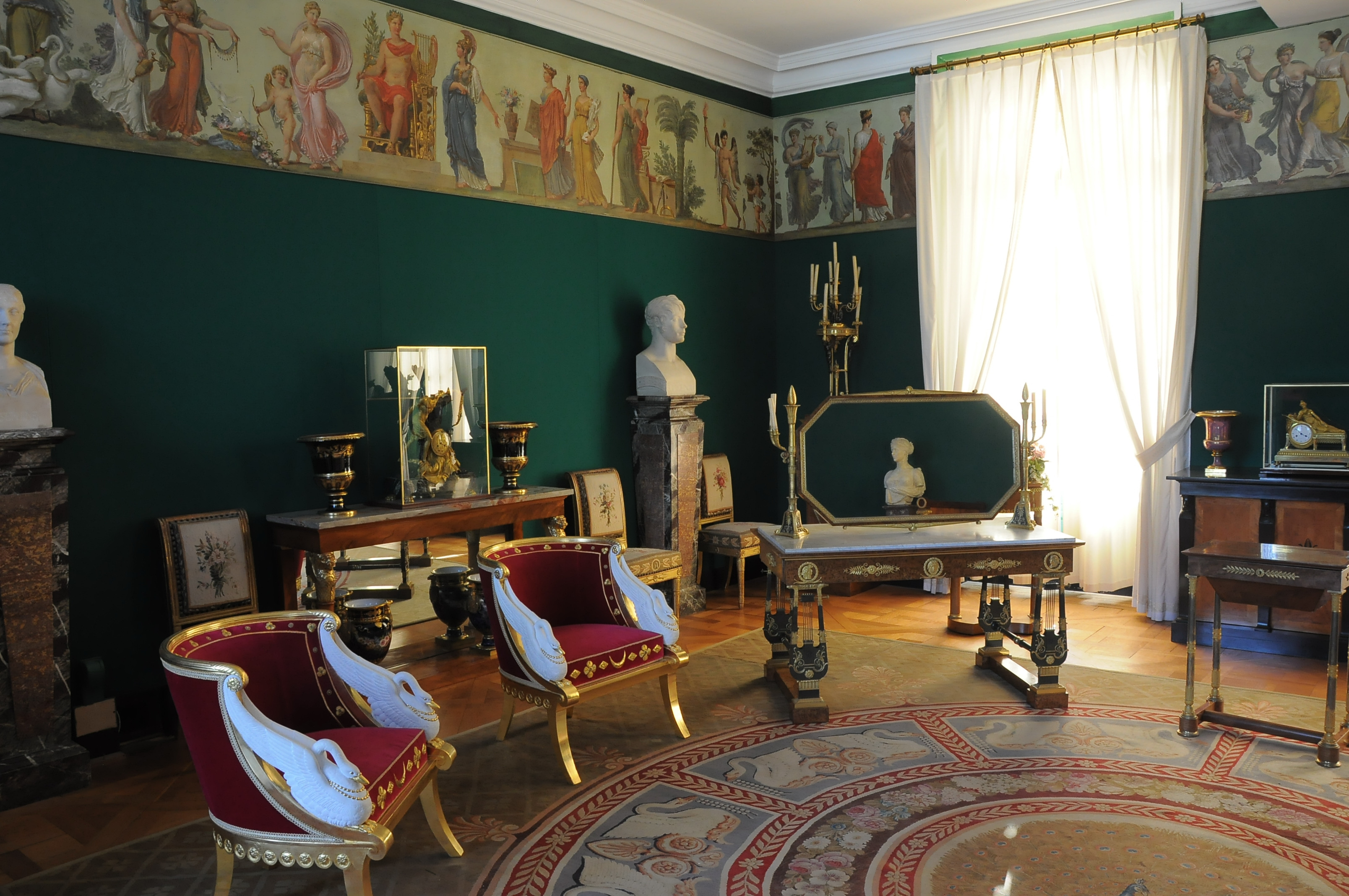
Château de Malmaison, 1800, room for the Empress Joséphine, on the cusp between Directoire style and Empire style

From about 1800 a fresh influx of Greek architectural examples, seen through the medium of etchings and engravings, gave a new impetus to Neoclassicism, the Greek Revival. At the same time the Empire style was a more grandiose wave of Neoclassicism in architecture and the decorative arts. Mainly based on Imperial Roman styles, it originated in, and took its name from, the rule of Napoleon in the First French Empire, where it was intended to idealize Napoleon's leadership and the French state. The style corresponds to the more bourgeois Biedermeier style in the German-speaking lands, Federal style in the United States, the Regency style in Britain, and the Napoleon style in Sweden. According to the art historian Hugh Honour "so far from being, as is sometimes supposed, the culmination of the Neoclassical movement, the Empire marks its rapid decline and transformation back once more into a mere antique revival, drained of all the high-minded ideas and force of conviction that had inspired its masterpieces". An earlier phase of the style was called the Adam style in Great Britain.

Neoclassicism continued to be a major force in academic art through the 19th century and beyond—a constant antithesis to Romanticism or Gothic revivals—although from the late 19th century on, it had often been considered anti-modern, or even reactionary, in influential critical circles. The centres of several European cities, notably Saint Petersburg and Munich, came to look much like museums of Neoclassical architecture.

Gothic revival architecture (often linked with the Romantic cultural movement), a style originating in the 18th century which grew in popularity throughout the 19th century, contrasted Neoclassicism. Whilst Neoclassicism was characterized by Greek and Roman-influenced styles, geometric lines and order, Gothic revival architecture placed an emphasis on medieval-looking buildings, often made to have a rustic, "romantic" appearance.

=== France ===
==== Louis XVI style (1774–1789) ====
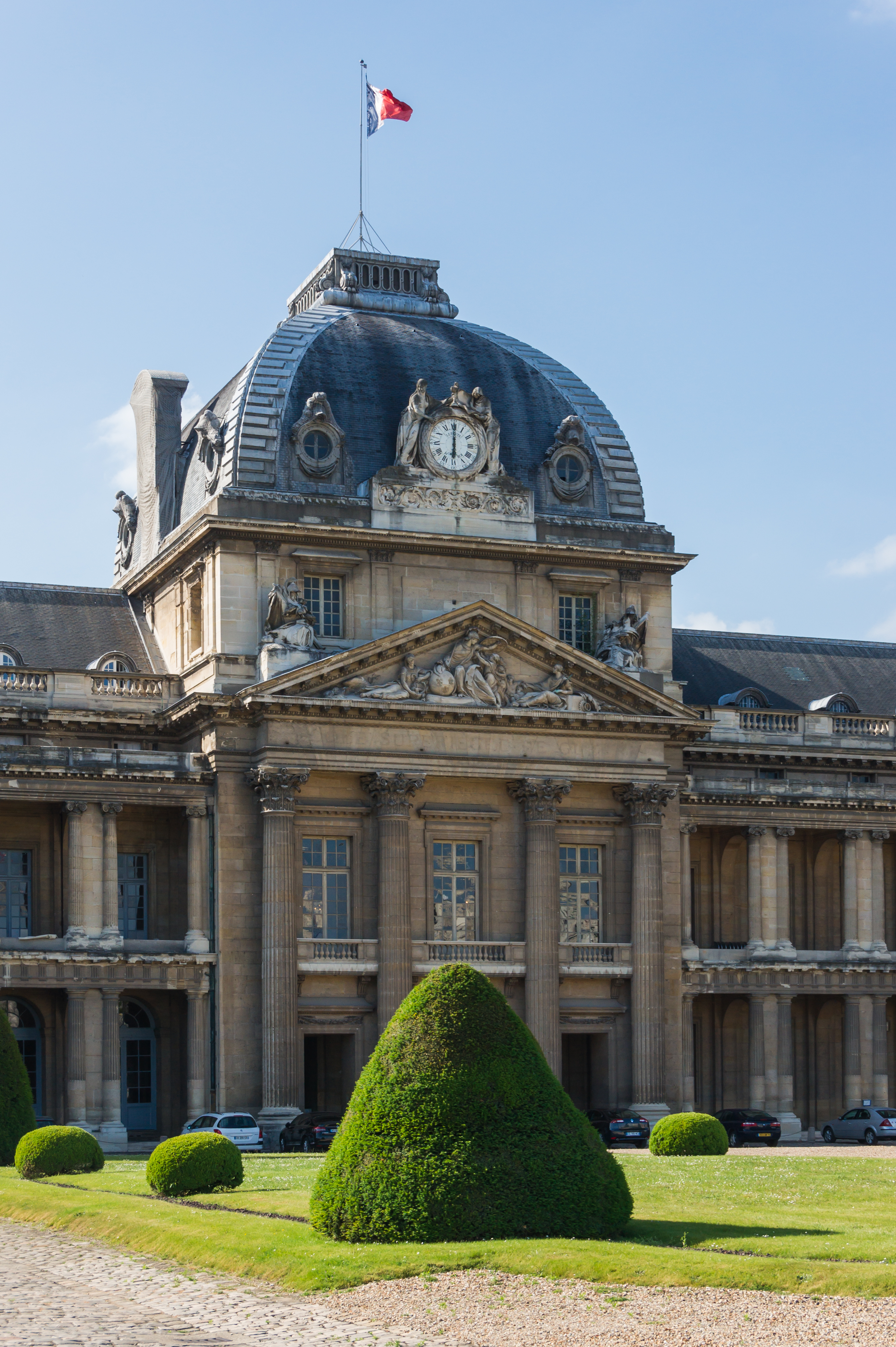
Central pavilion of the École militaire, Paris, 1752, by Ange-Jacques Gabriel

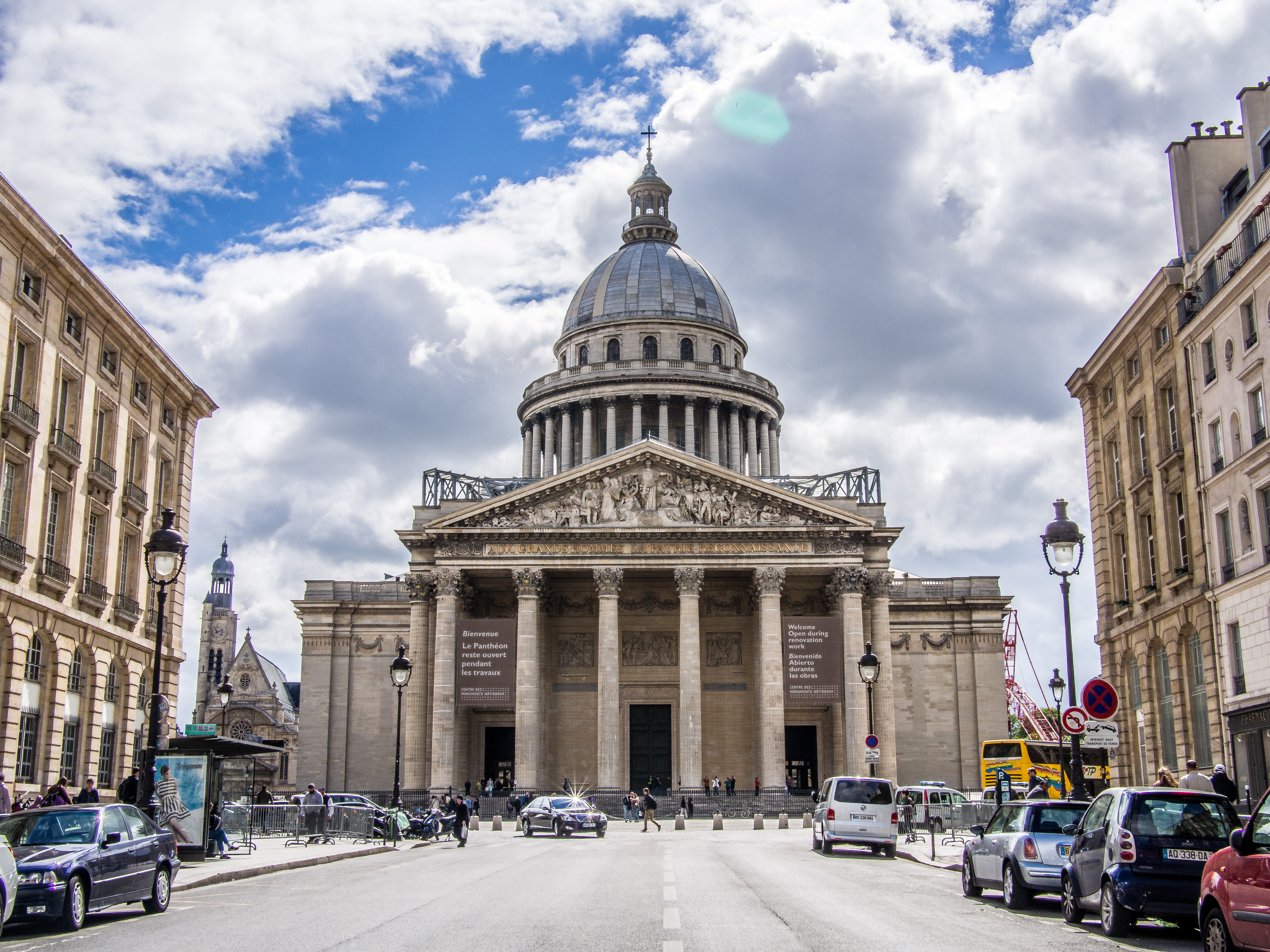
Panthéon, Paris, by Jacques-Germain Soufflot and Jean-Baptiste Rondelet, 1758–1790

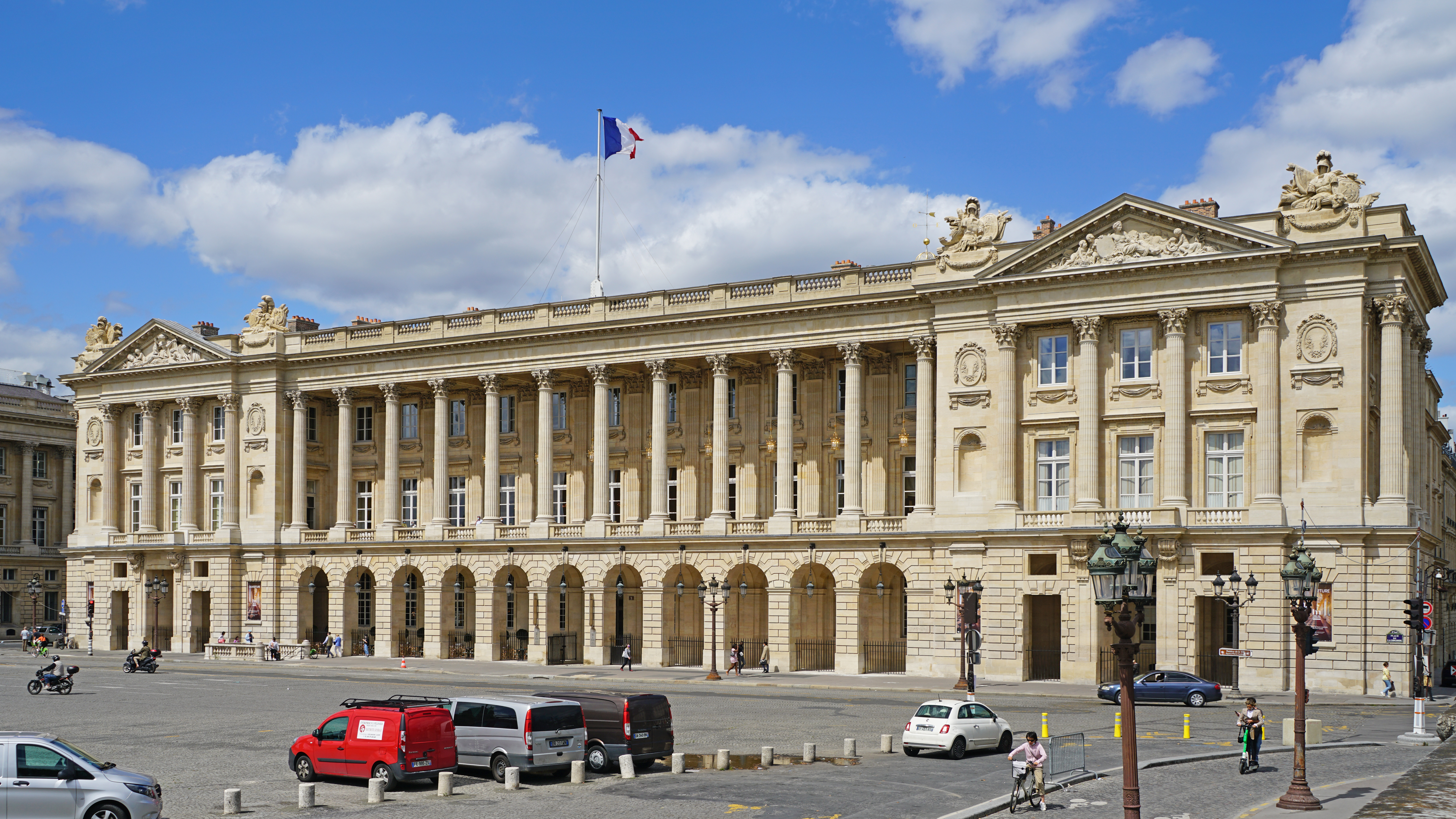
Hôtel de la Marine, Paris, by Ange-Jacques Gabriel, 1761-1770

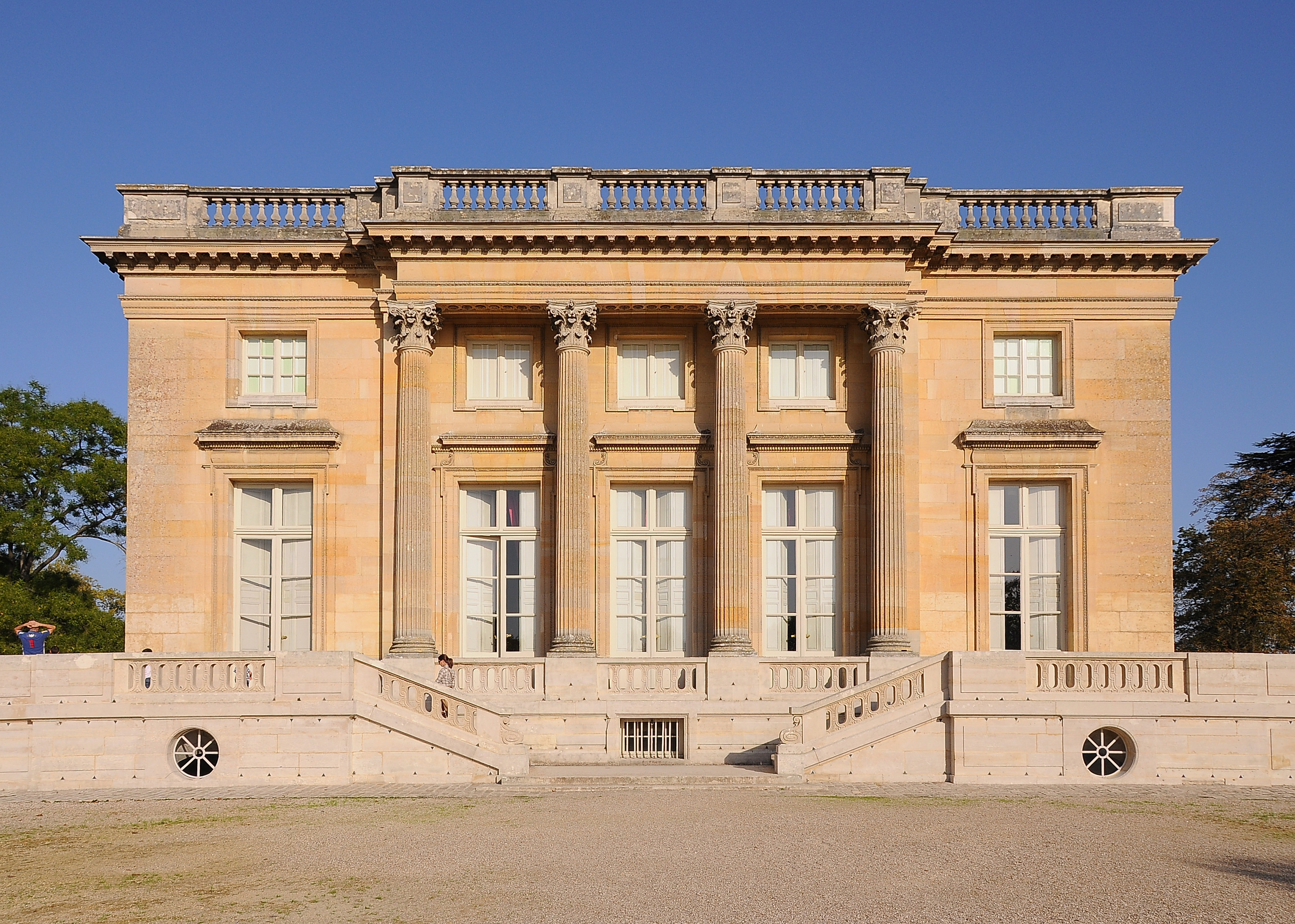
Façade of the Petit Trianon, Versailles, France, by Ange-Jacques Gabriel, 1764

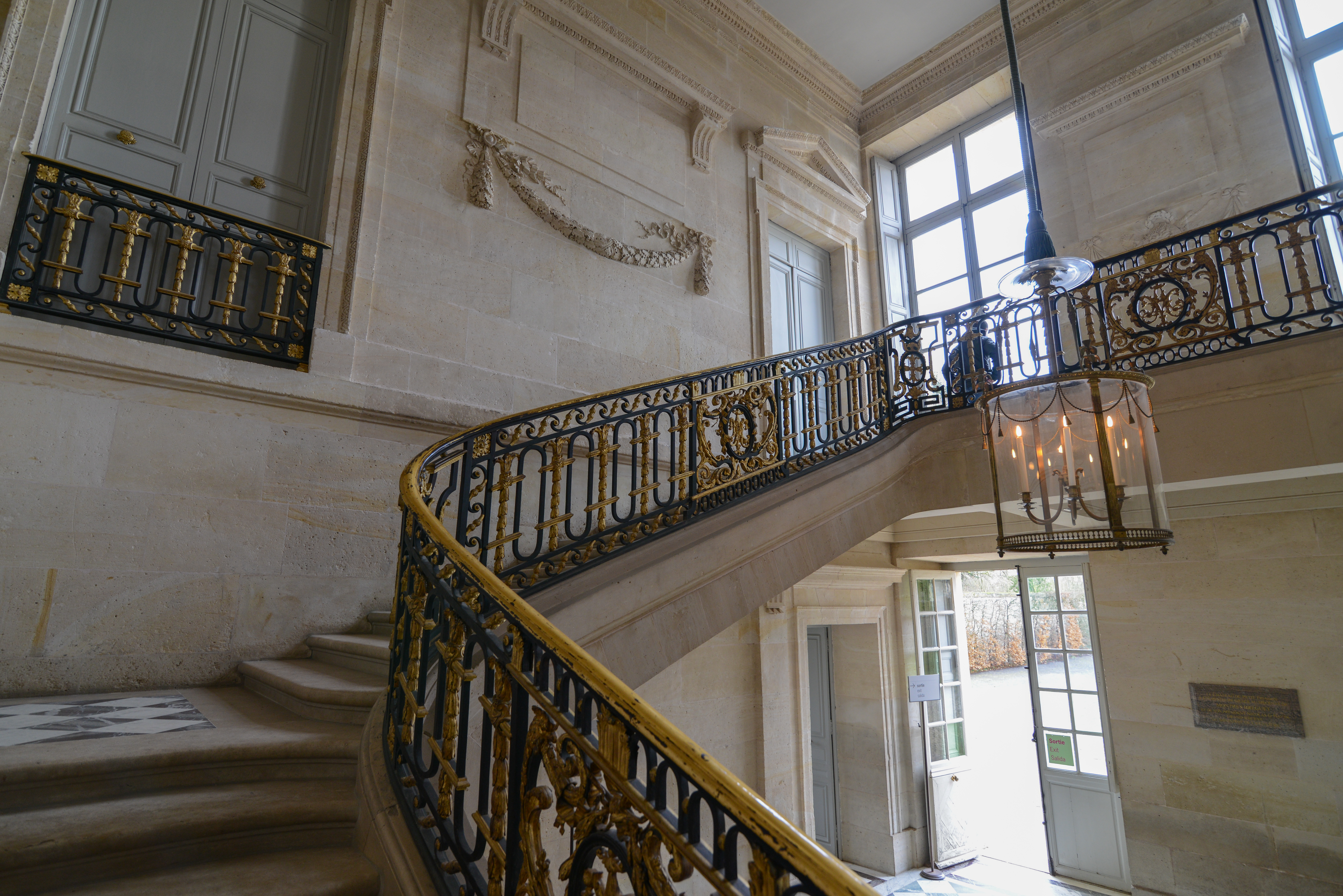
Staircase of the Petit Trianon, by Ange-Jacques Gabriel, 1764

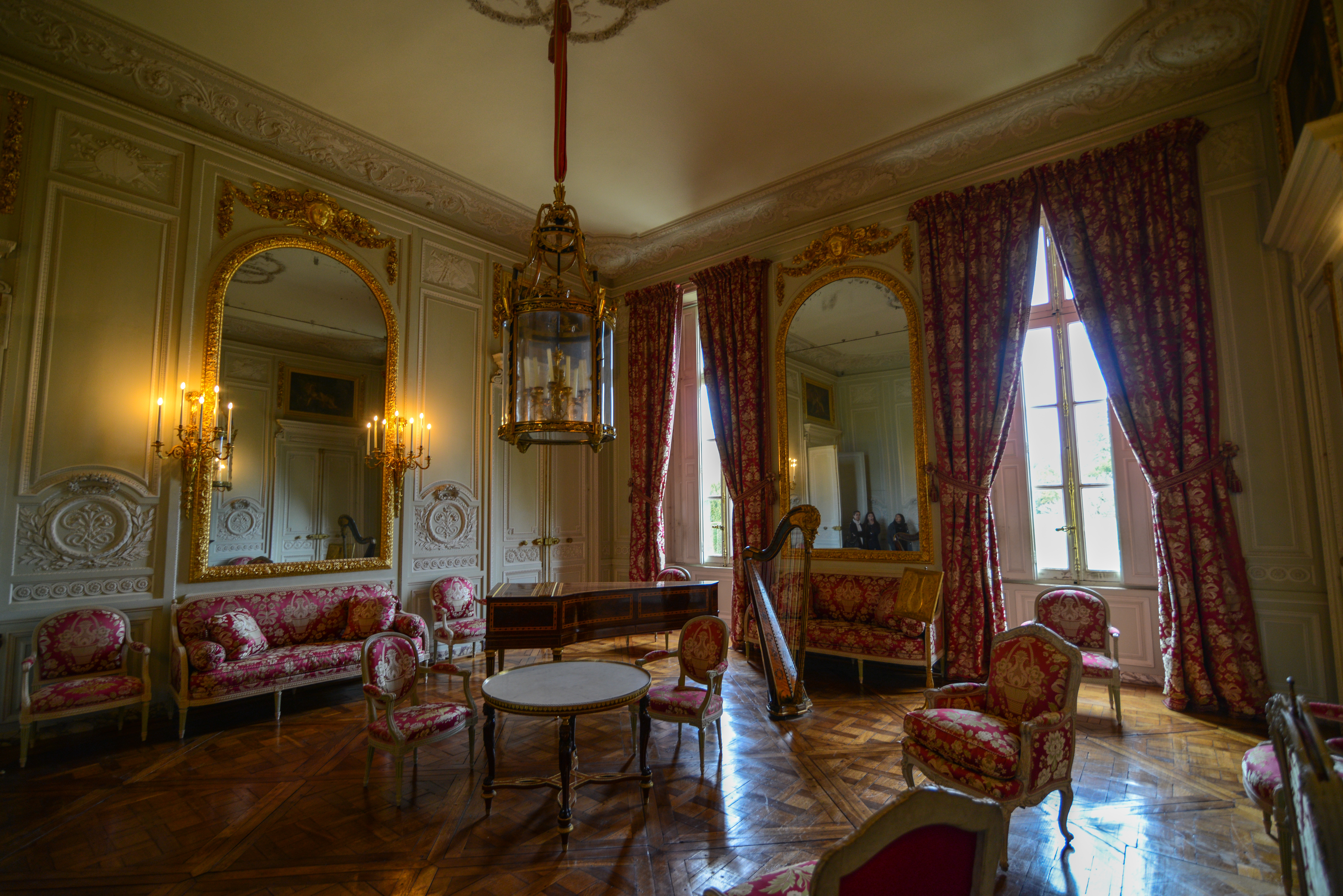
Interior of the Petit Trianon, by Ange-Jacques Gabriel, 1764

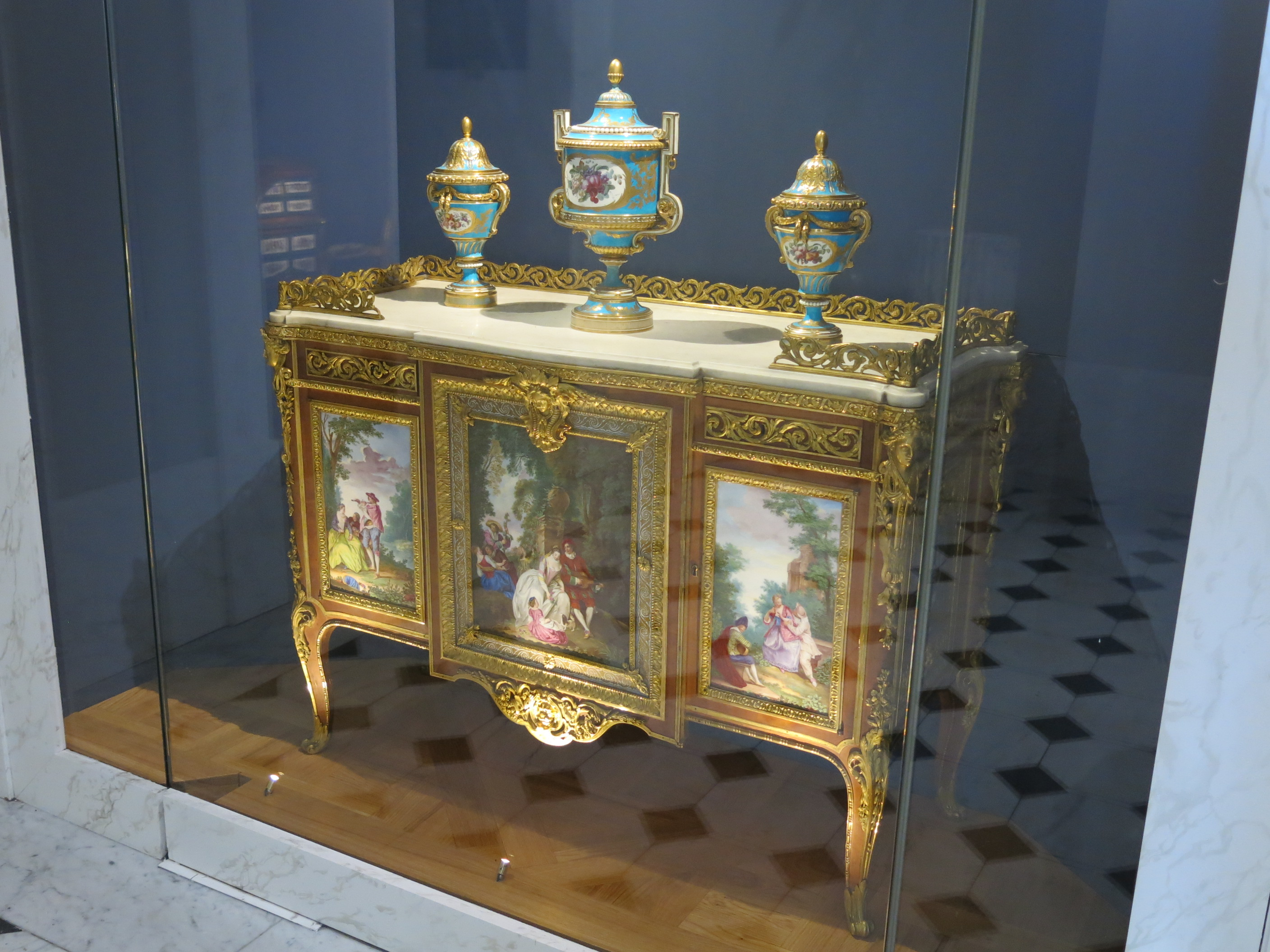
Commode of Madame du Barry; by Martin Carlin (attribution); 1772; oak base veneered with pearwood, rosewood and amaranth, soft-paste Sèvres porcelain, bronze gilt, white marble; 87 x 119 cm; Louvre

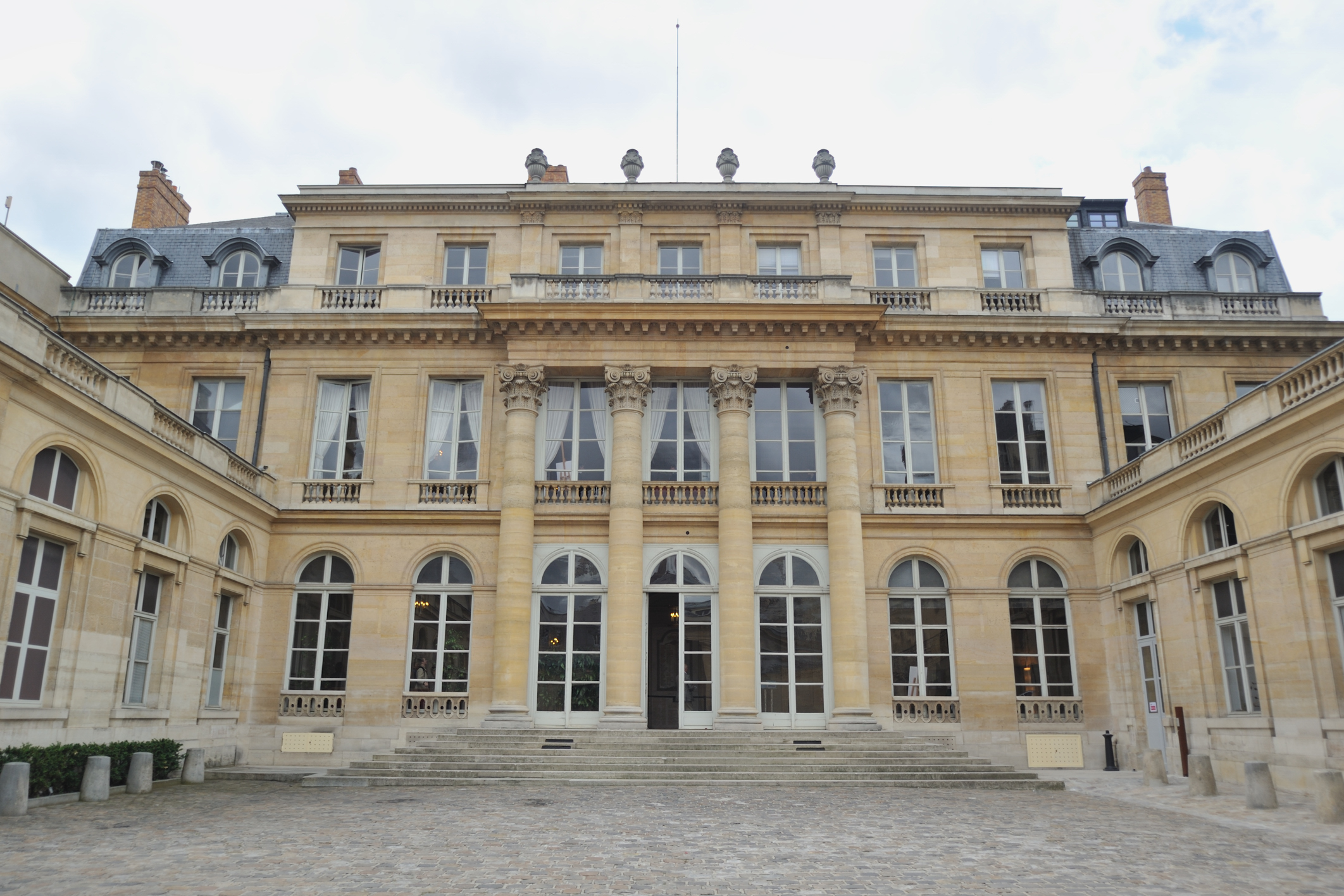
Hôtel du Châtelet, Paris, unknown architect, 1776

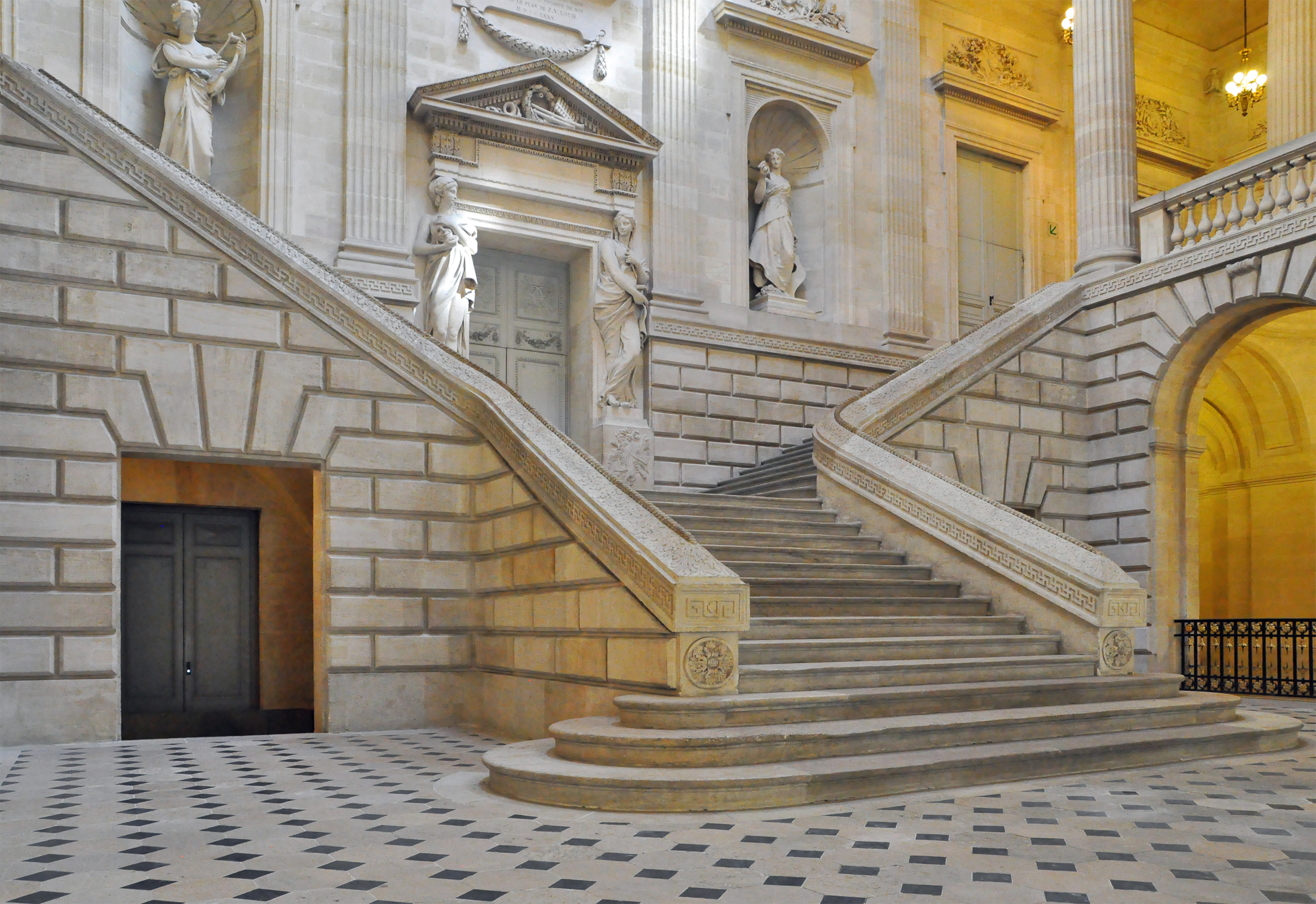
Stairway of the Grand Theater of Bordeaux, Bordeaux, France, by Victor Louis, 1777-1780

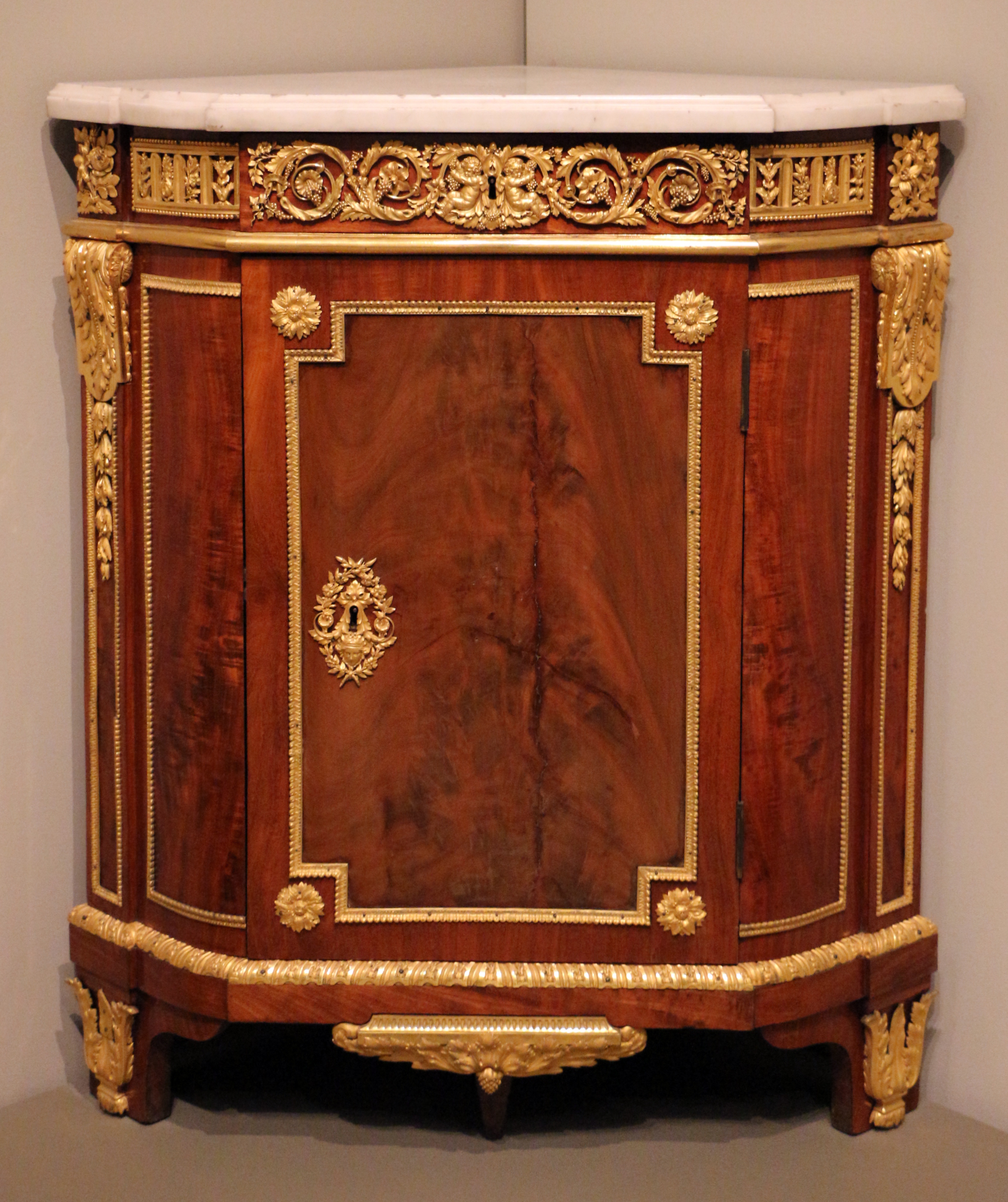
Parisian corner cabinet; by Jean Henri Riesener; 1780–1790; oak, mahogany, marble, and ormolu mounts; 94.3 × 81.3 × 55.9 cm; Art Institute of Chicago, US

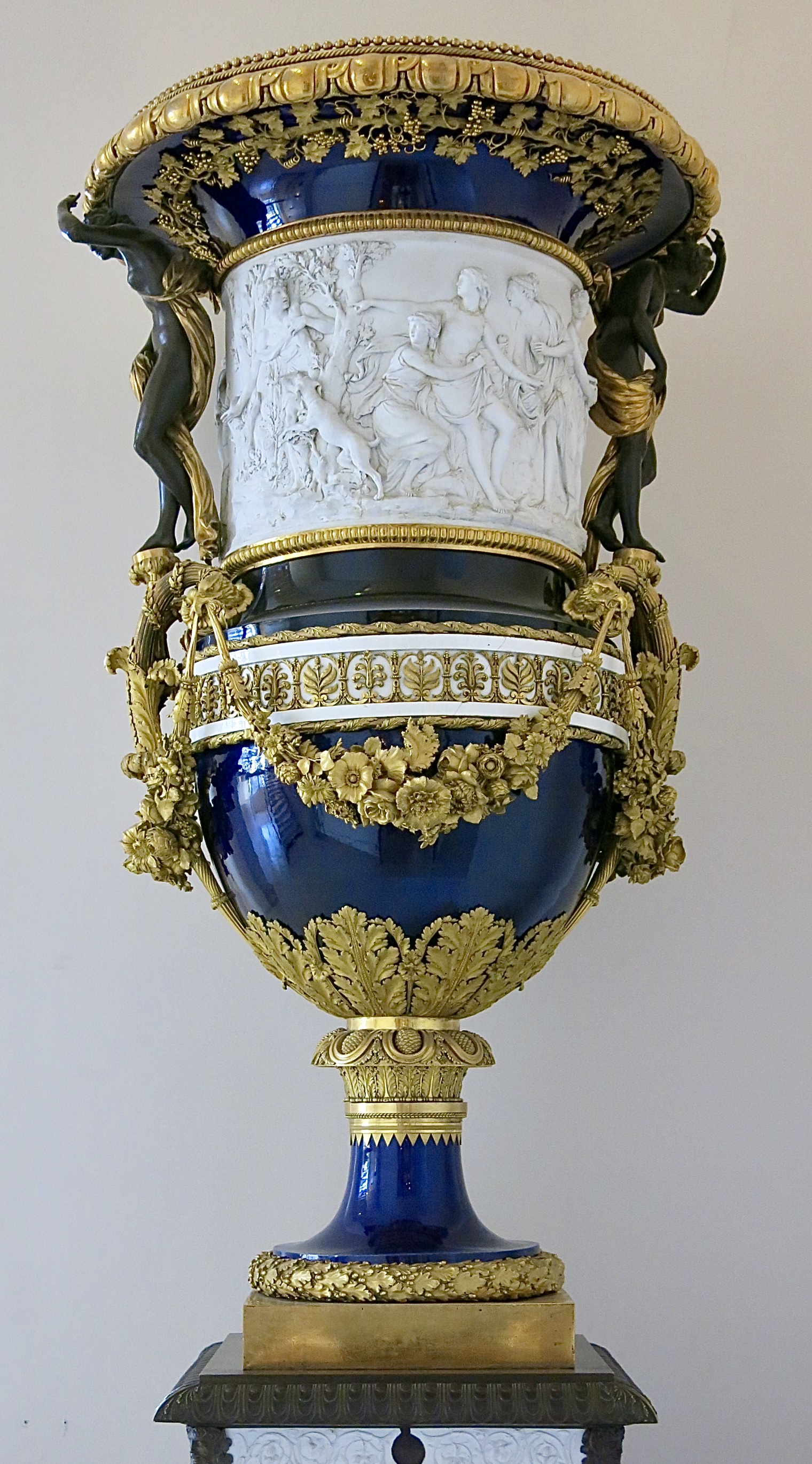
Large vase; 1783; hard porcelain and gilt bronze; height: 2 m, diameter: 0.90 m; Louvre

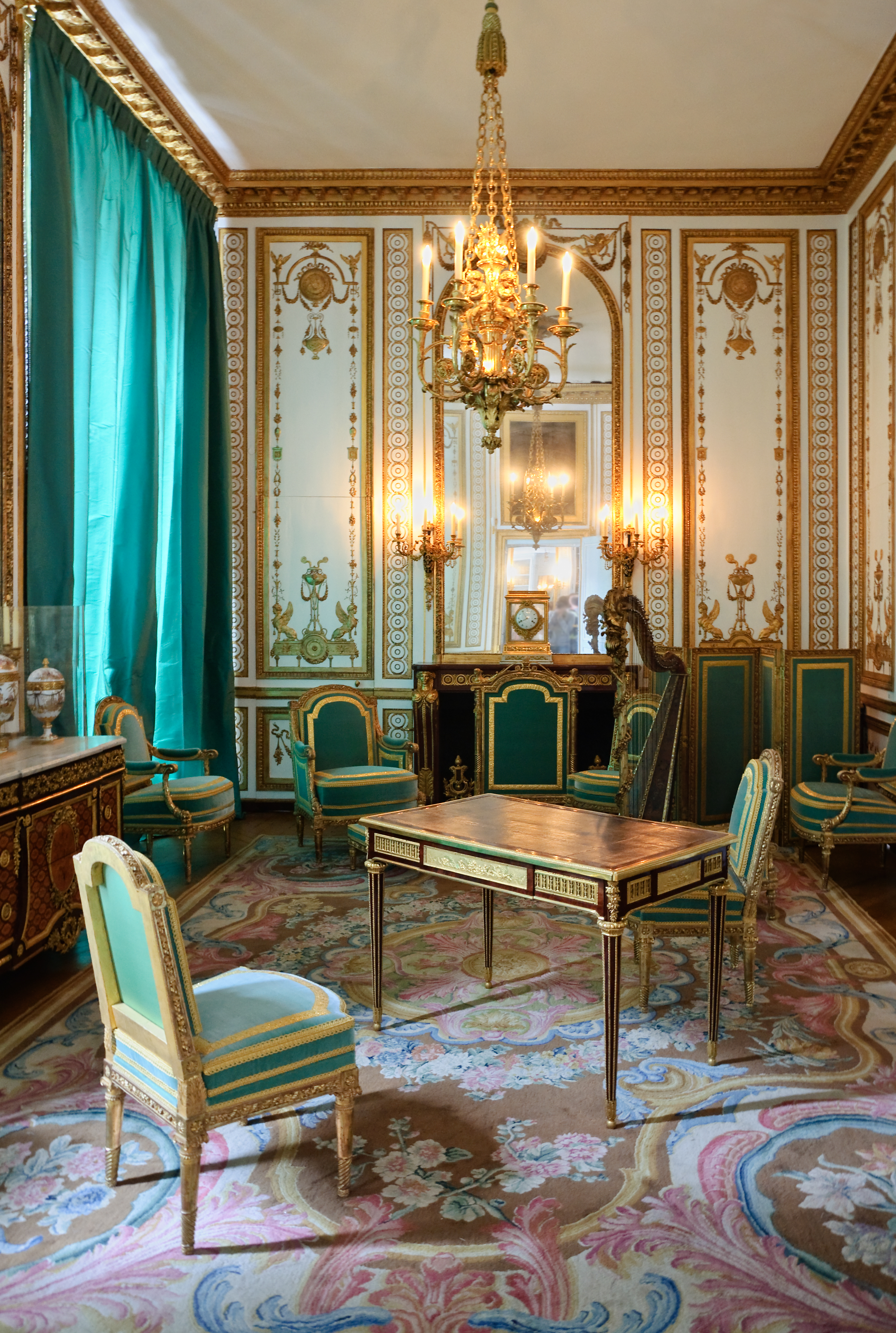
Cabinet Doré of Marie Antoinette at the Palace of Versailles, Versailles, France, by the Rousseau brothers, 1783

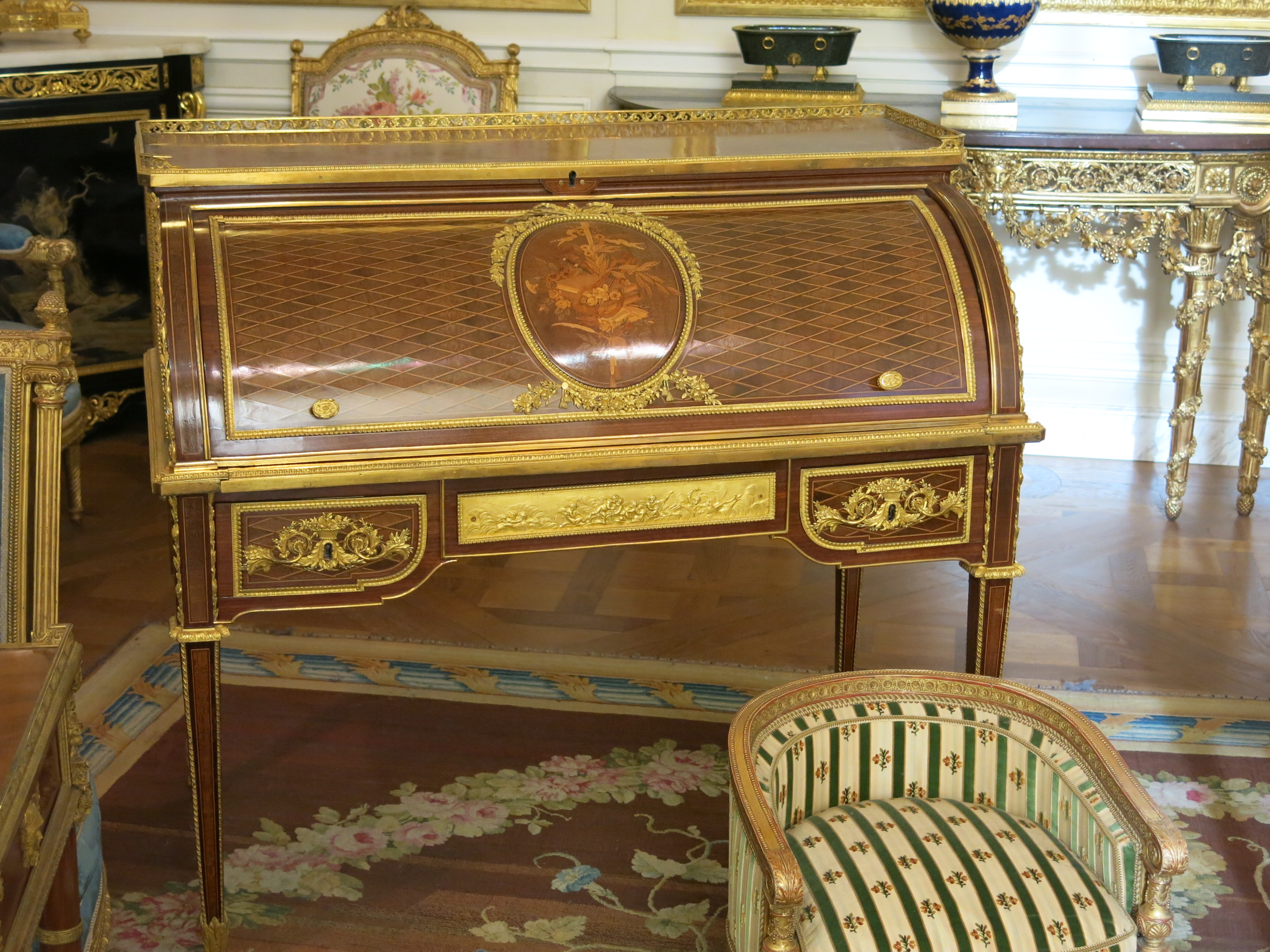
Roll-top desk of Marie-Antoinette; by Jean-Henri Riesener; 1784; oak and pine frame, sycamore, amaranth and rosewood veneer, bronze gilt; 103.6 x 113.4 cm; Louvre

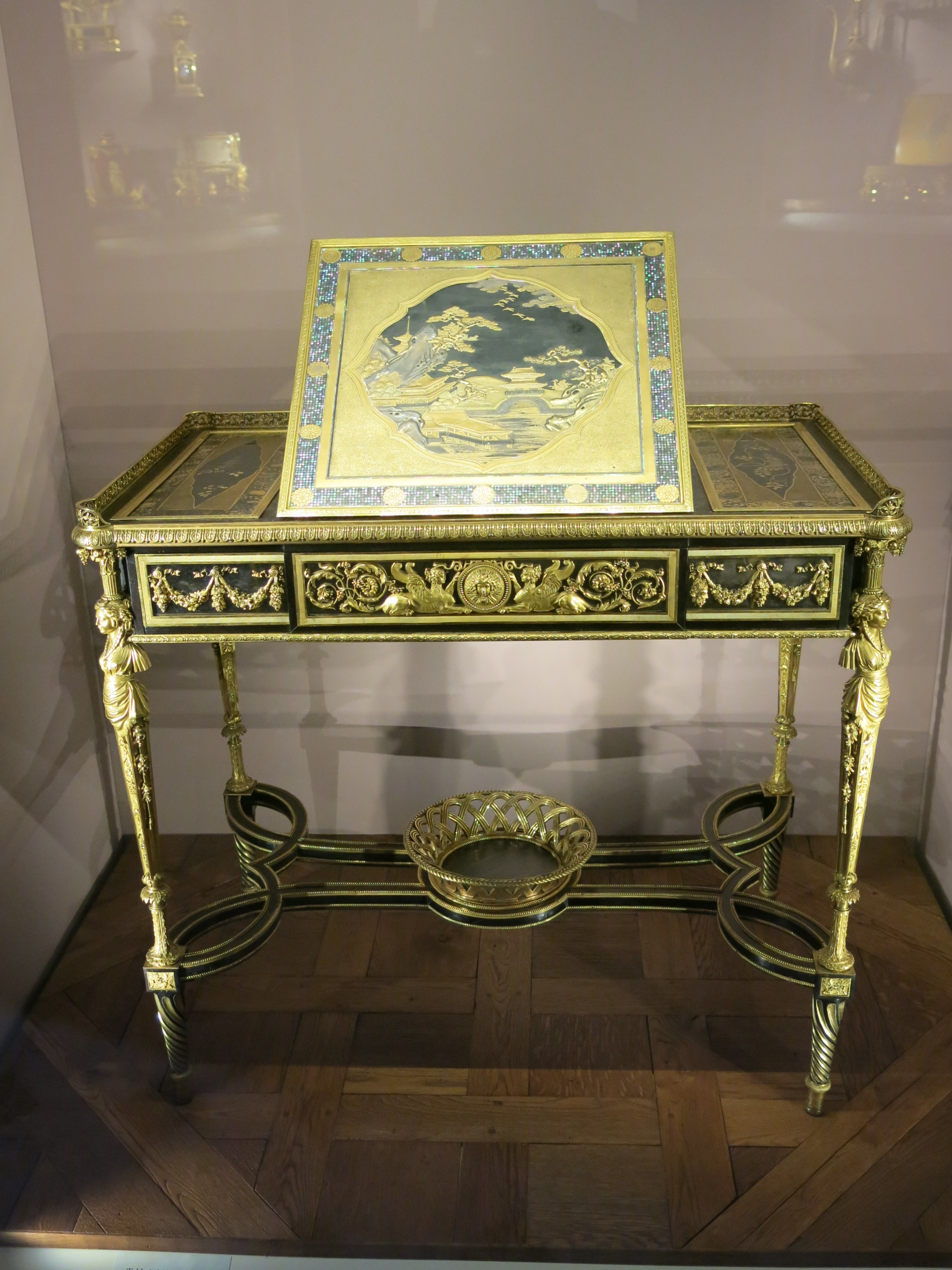
Writing table of Marie Antoinette; by Adam Weisweiler; 1784; oak, ebony and sycamore veneer, Japanese lacquer, steel, bronze gilt; 73.7 x 81. 2 cm; Louvre

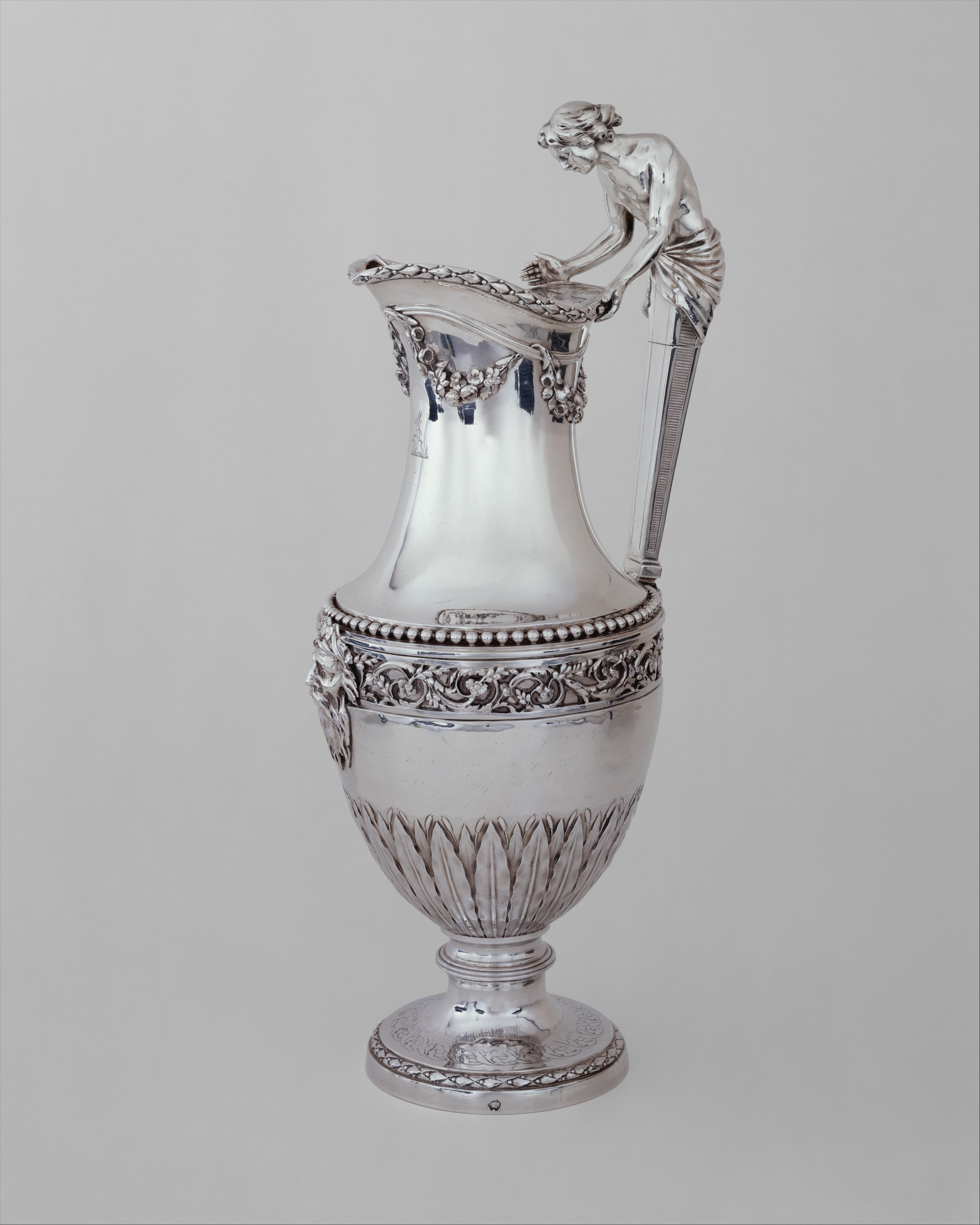
Ewer; 1784–1785; silver; height: 32.9 cm; Metropolitan Museum of Art

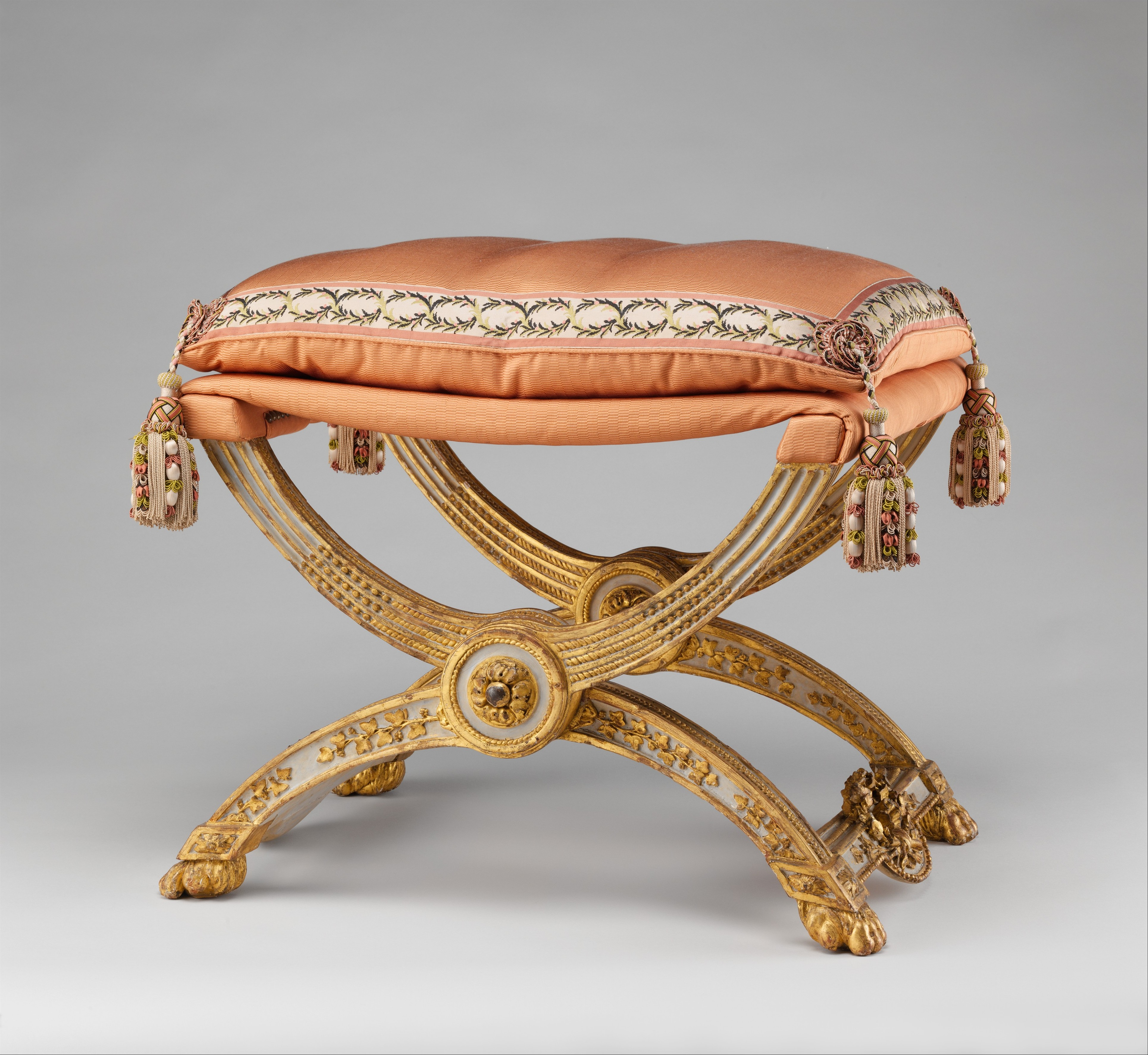
Folding stool (pliant); 1786; carved and painted beechwood, covered in pink silk; 46.4 × 68.6 × 51.4 cm; Metropolitan Museum of Art

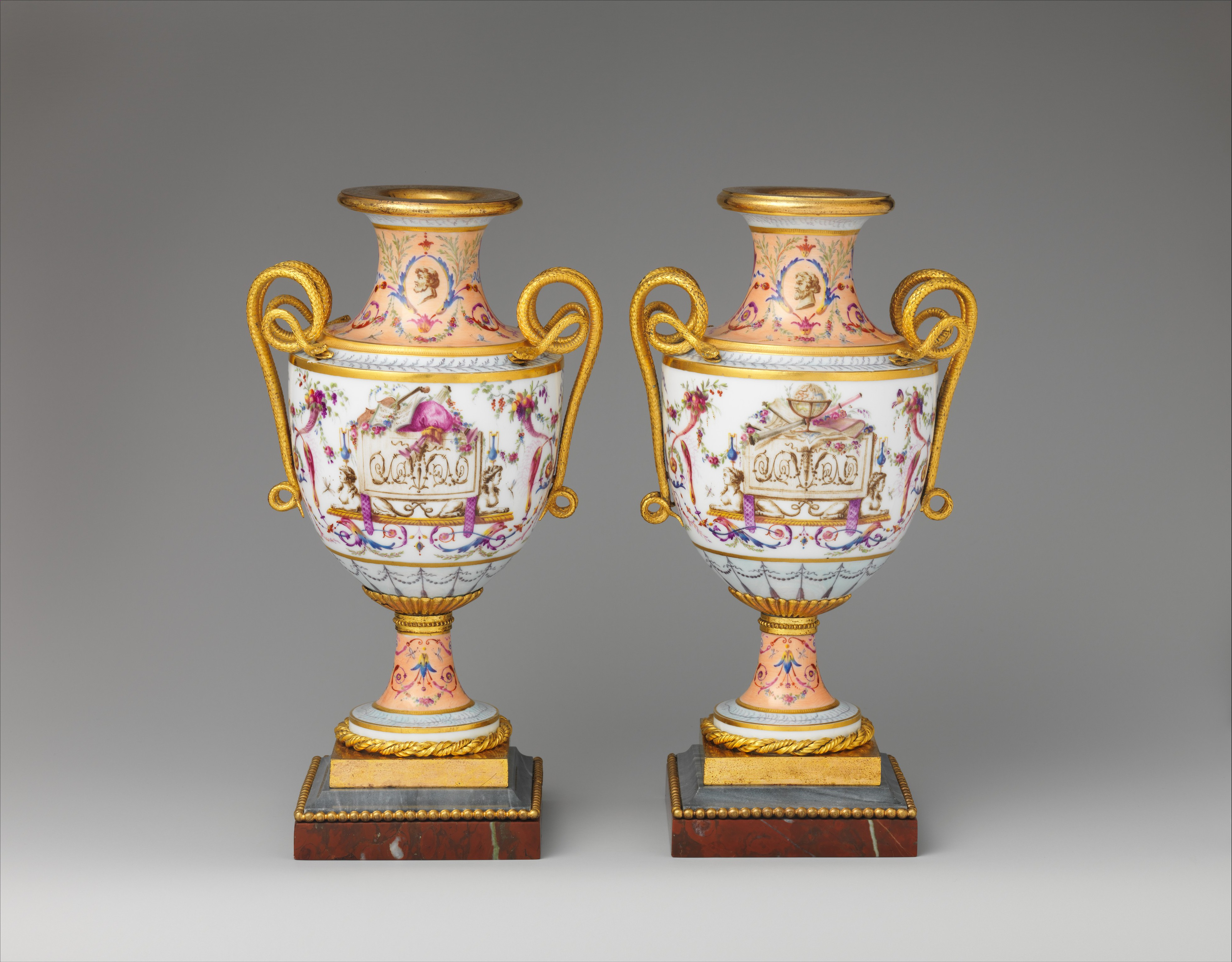
Pair of vases; 1789; hard-paste porcelain, gilt bronze, marble; height (each): 23 cm; Metropolitan Museum of Art

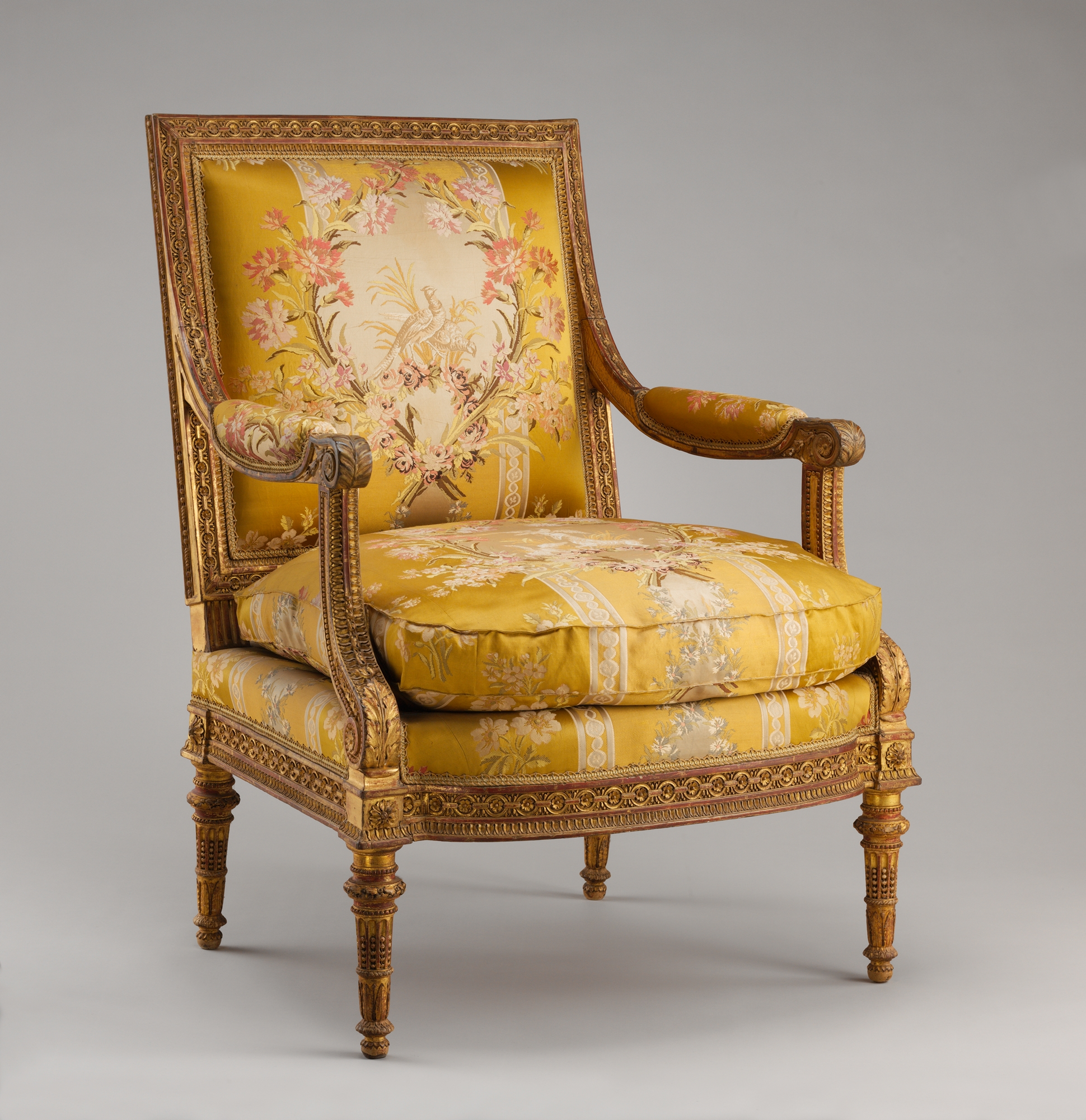
Armchair (fauteuil) from Louis XVI's Salon des Jeux at Saint-Cloud; 1788; carved and gilded walnut, gold brocaded silk (not original); overall: 100 × 74.9 × 65.1 cm; Metropolitan Museum of Art

It marks the transition from Rococo to Classicism. Unlike the Classicism of Louis XIV, which transformed ornaments into symbols, Louis XVI style represents them as realistic and natural as possible, i.e. laurel branches really are laurel branches, roses the same, and so on. One of the main decorative principles is symmetry. In interiors, the colours used are very bright, including white, light grey, bright blue, pink, yellow, very light lilac, and gold. Excesses of ornamentation are avoided. The return to antiquity is synonymous with above all with a return to the straight lines: strict verticals and horizontals were the order of the day. Serpentine ones were no longer tolerated, save for the occasional half circle or oval. Interior decor also honored this taste for rigor, with the result that flat surfaces and right angles returned to fashion. Ornament was used to mediate this severity, but it never interfered with basic lines and always was disposed symmetrically around a central axis. Even so, ébénistes often canted fore-angles to avoid excessive rigidity.

The decorative motifs of Louis XVI style were inspired by antiquity, the Louis XIV style, and nature. Characteristic elements of the style: a torch crossed with a sheath with arrows, imbricated disks, guilloché, double bow-knots, smoking braziers, linear repetitions of small motifs (rosettes, beads, oves), trophy or floral medallions hanging from a knotted ribbon, acanthus leaves, gadrooning, interlace, meanders, cornucopias, mascarons, Ancient urns, tripods, perfume burners, dolphins, ram and lion heads, chimeras, and gryphons. Greco-Roman architectural motifs are also heavily used: flutings, pilasters (fluted and unfluted), fluted balusters (twisted and straight), columns (engaged and unengaged, sometimes replaced by caryathids), volute corbels, triglyphs with guttae (in relief and trompe-l'œil).

==== Directoire style (1789–1804) ====
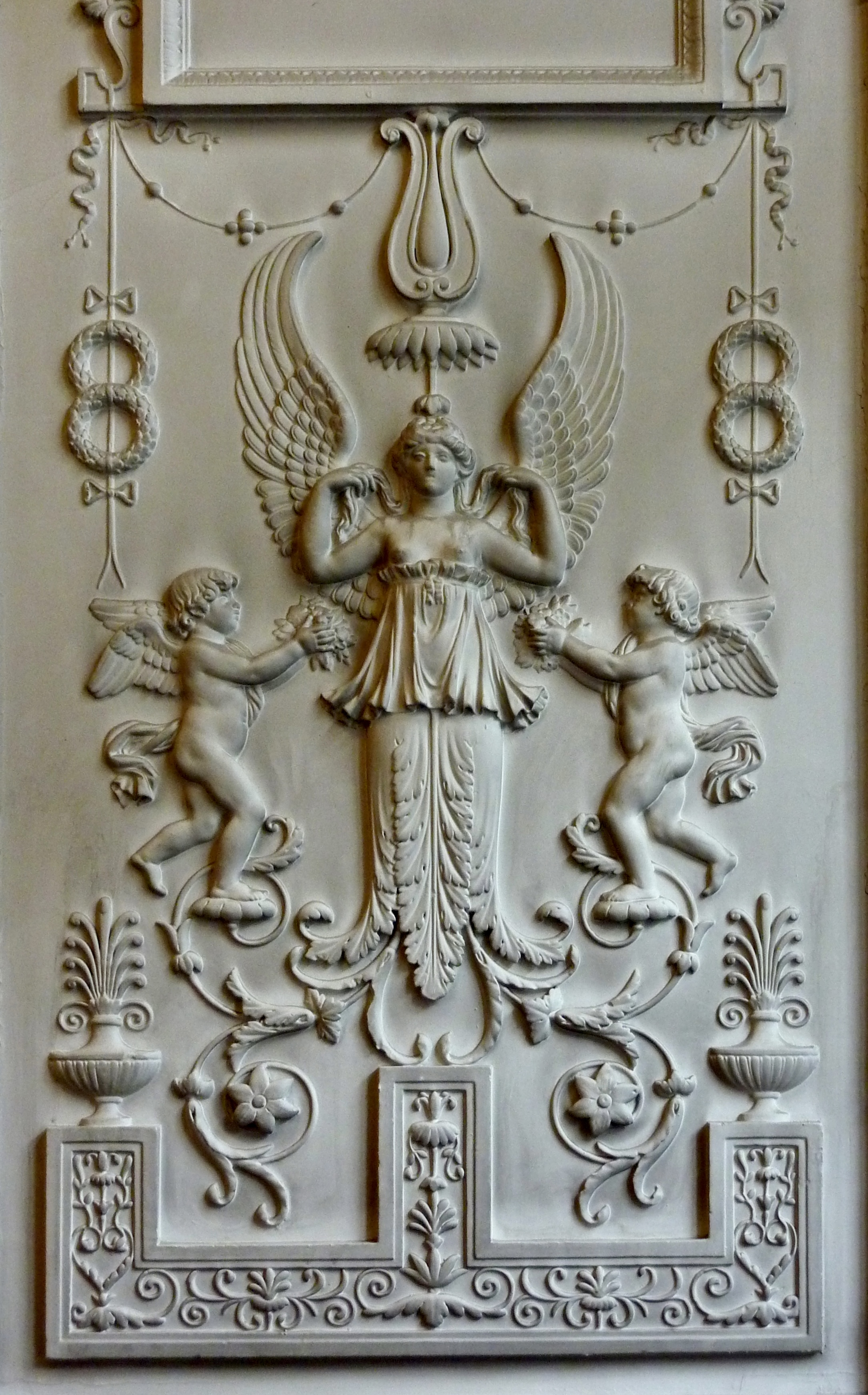
Panel with a grotesque in the Hôtel Gouthière, Paris, unknown architect, unknown date

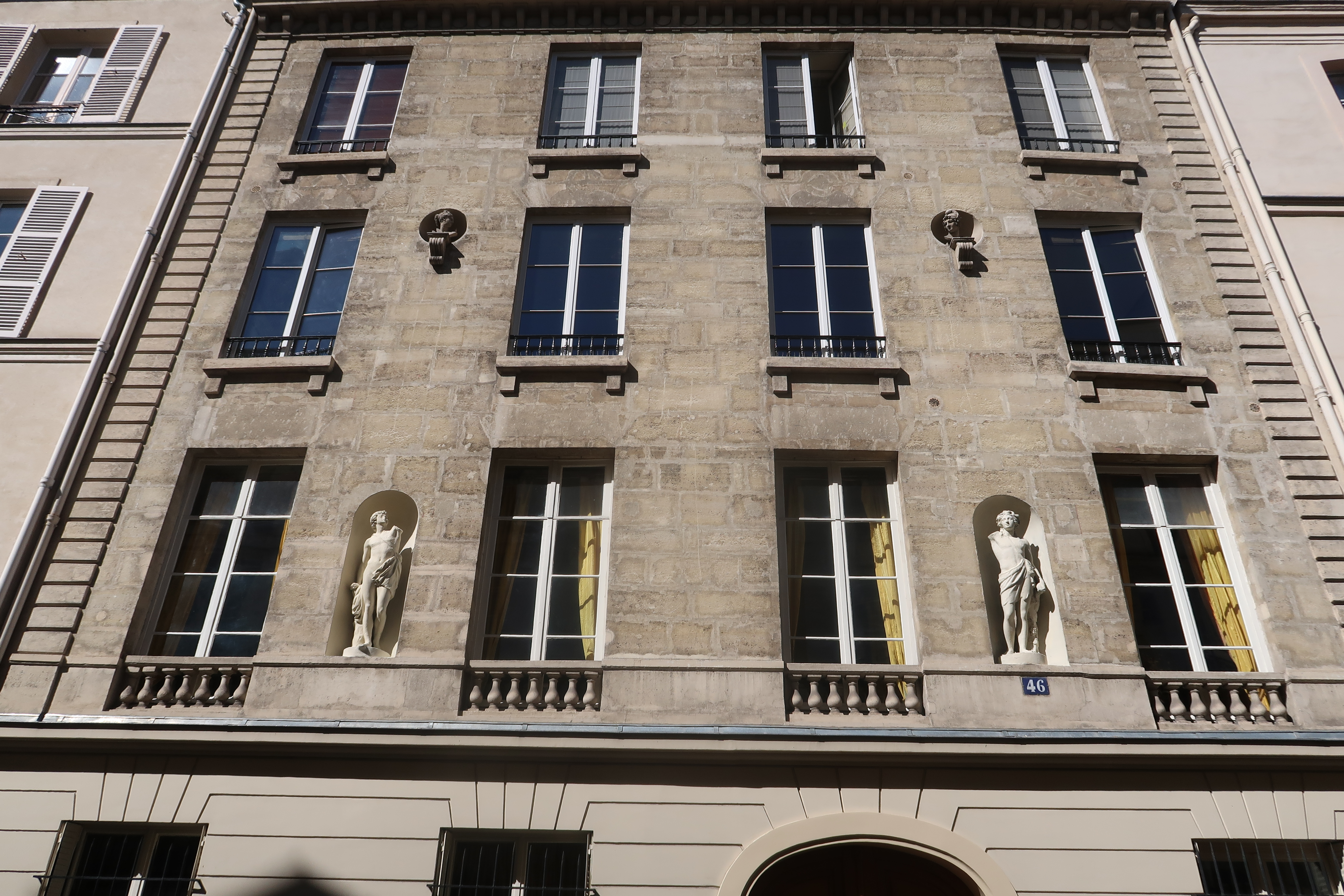
Rue Jacob no. 46, Paris, unknown architect, unknown date

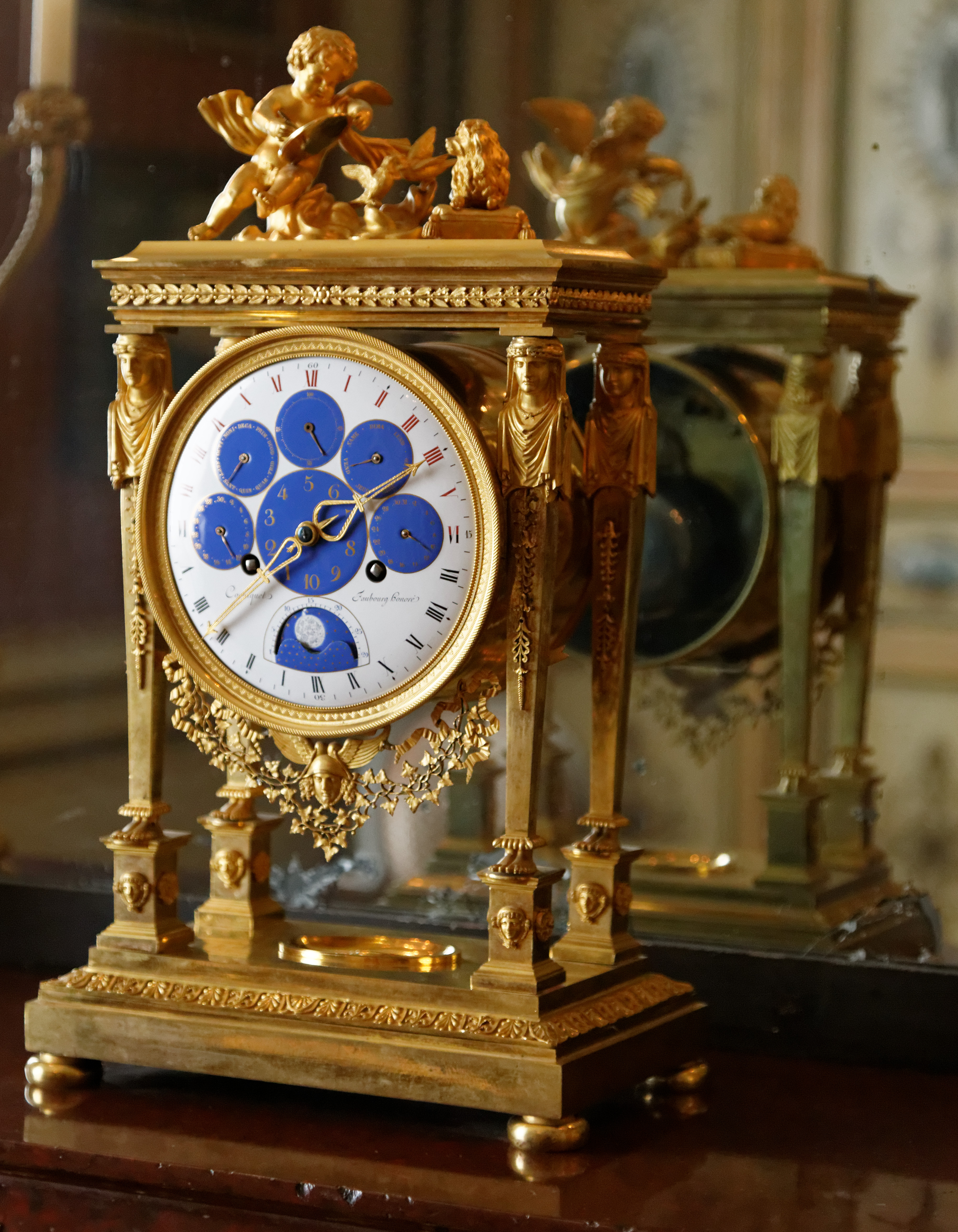
Astronomical clock; by Philippe-Jacques Corniquet; c.1794; gilt bronze and enamel face; unknown dimensions; Musée des Arts décoratifs, Paris

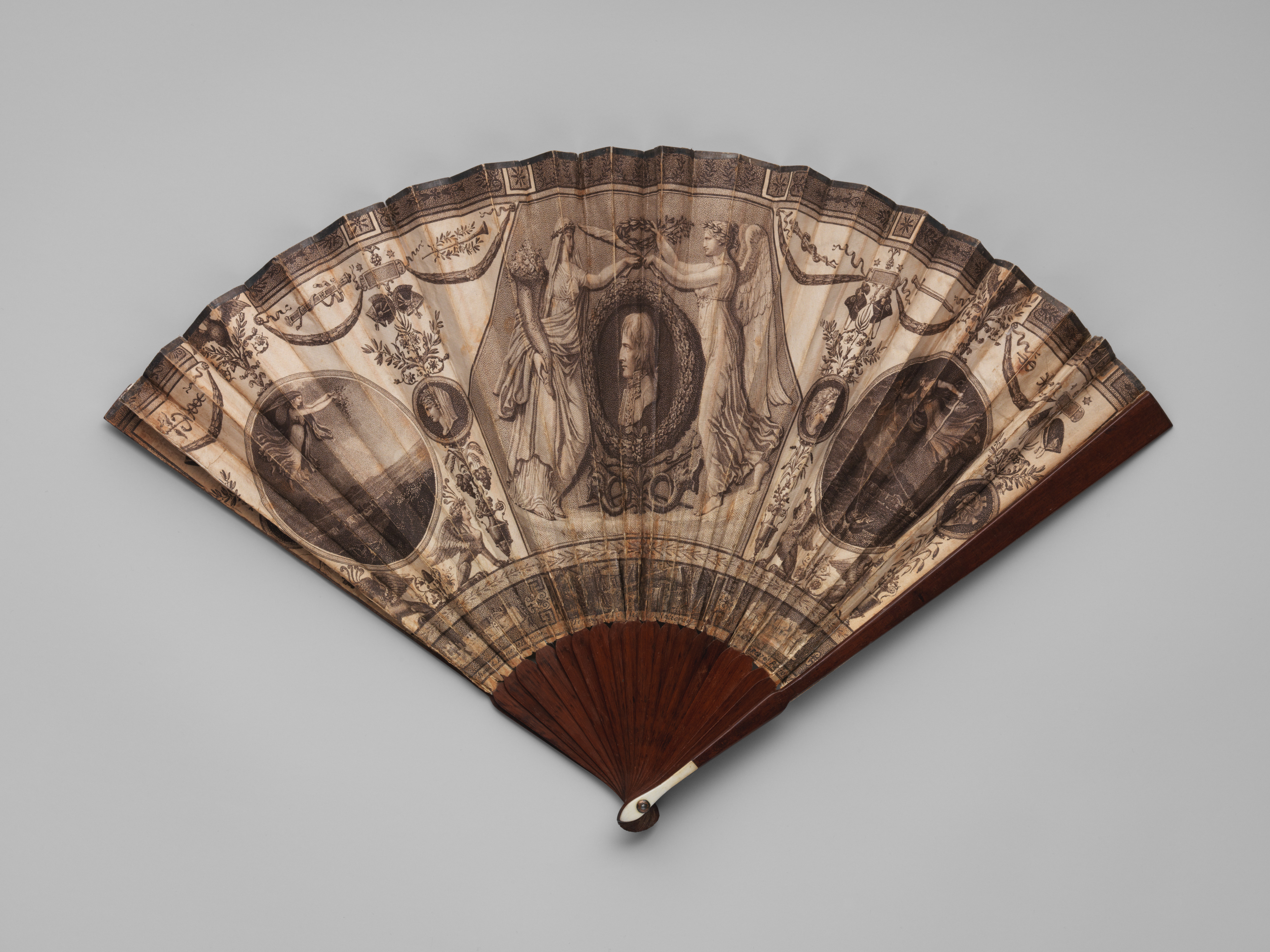
Fan; by Charles Percier, Pierre-François-Léonard Fontaine and Antoine Denis Chaudet; c.1797-1799; paper, wood, and bone; 23.5 x 43.8 cm; Metropolitan Museum of Art (New York City)

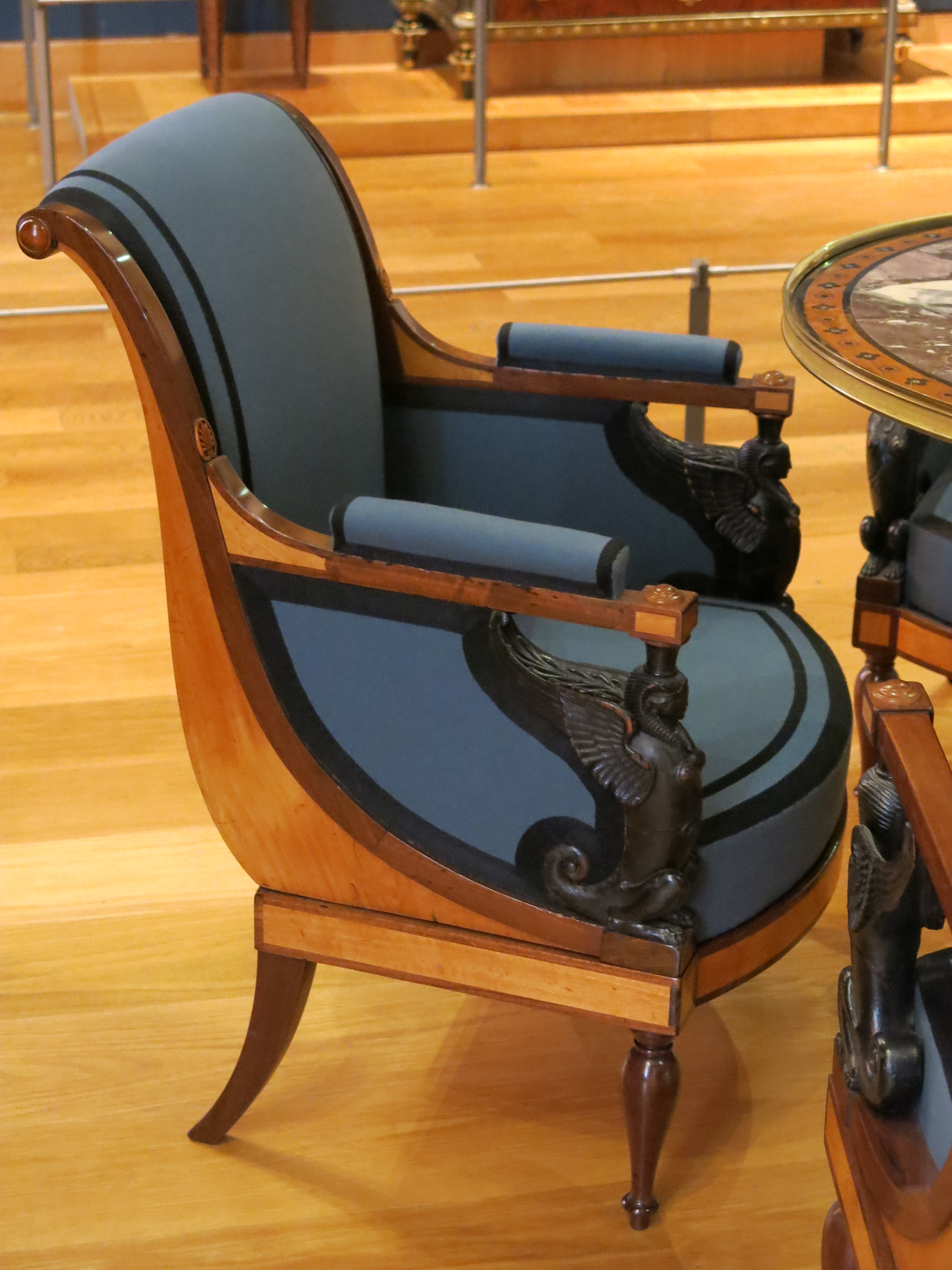
Armchair of the salon of Juliette Récamier; attributed to Jacob Frères; c.1798; various types of wood; 84.5 x 62.2 x 62 cm; Louvre

==== Empire style (1804–1815) ====
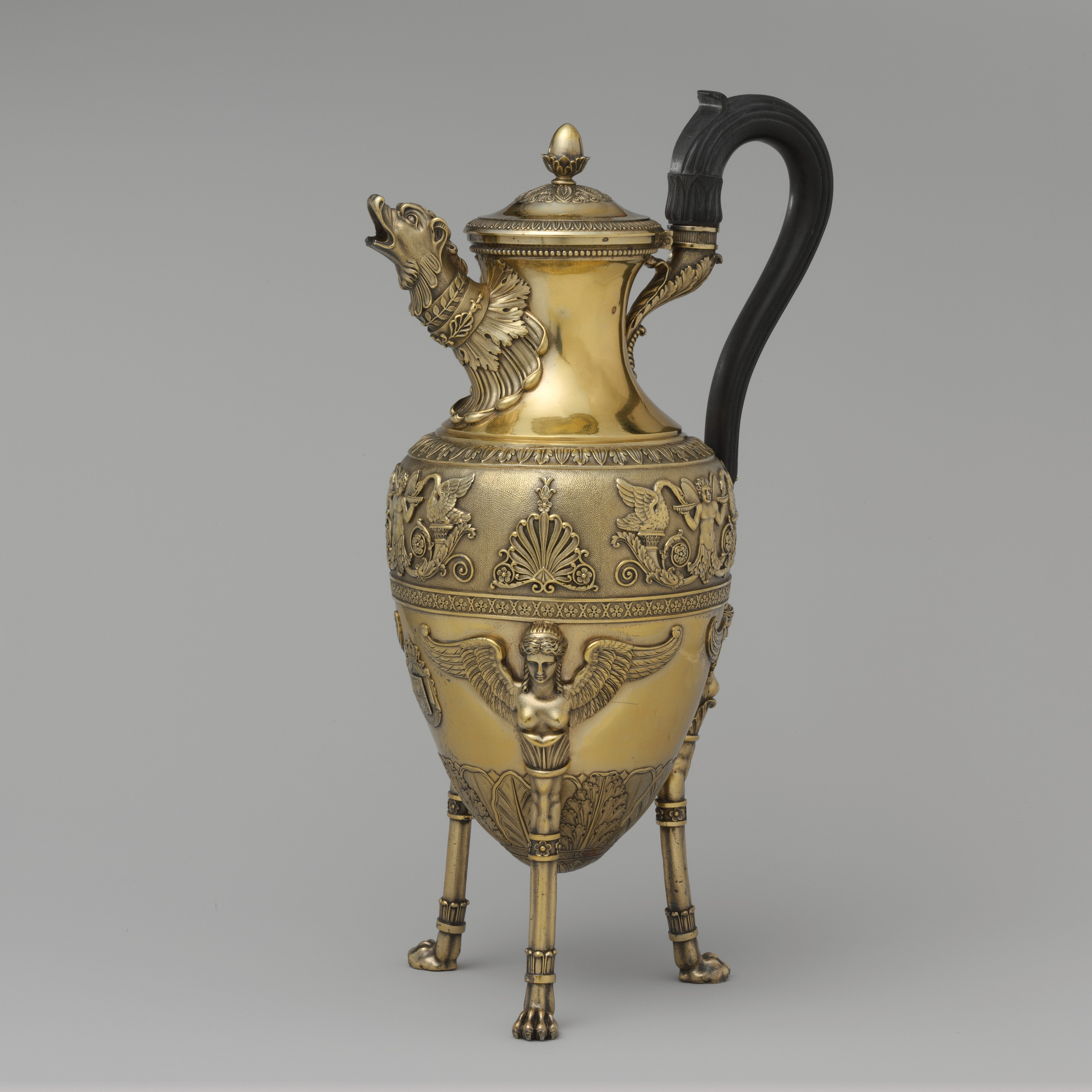
Coffeepot; 1797–1809; silver gilt; height: 33.3 cm; Metropolitan Museum of Art, New York City

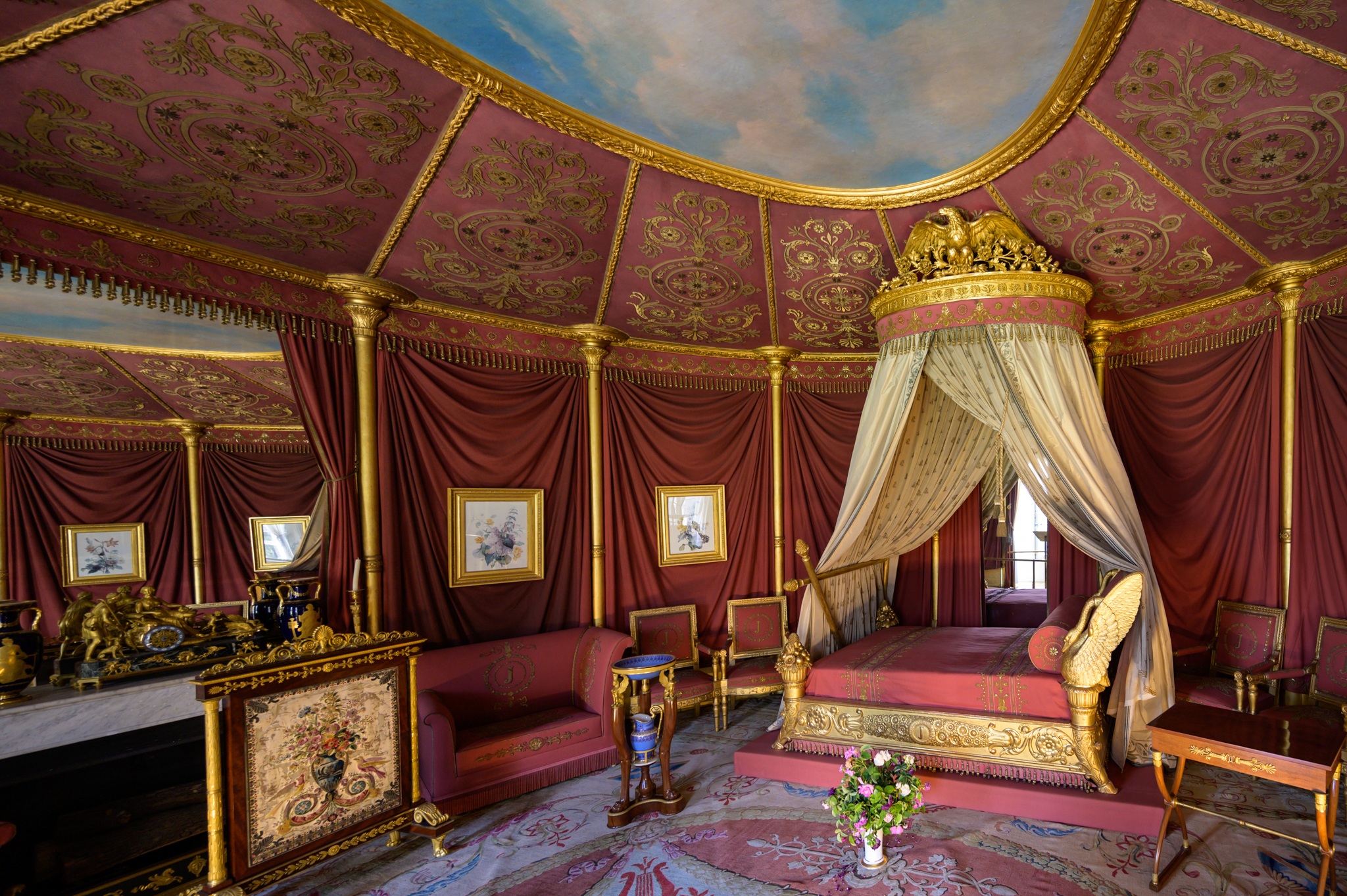
Empress Joséphine's Bedroom in Château de Malmaison, Rueil-Malmaison, France, by Charles Percier and Pierre-François-Léonard Fontaine, 1800-1802

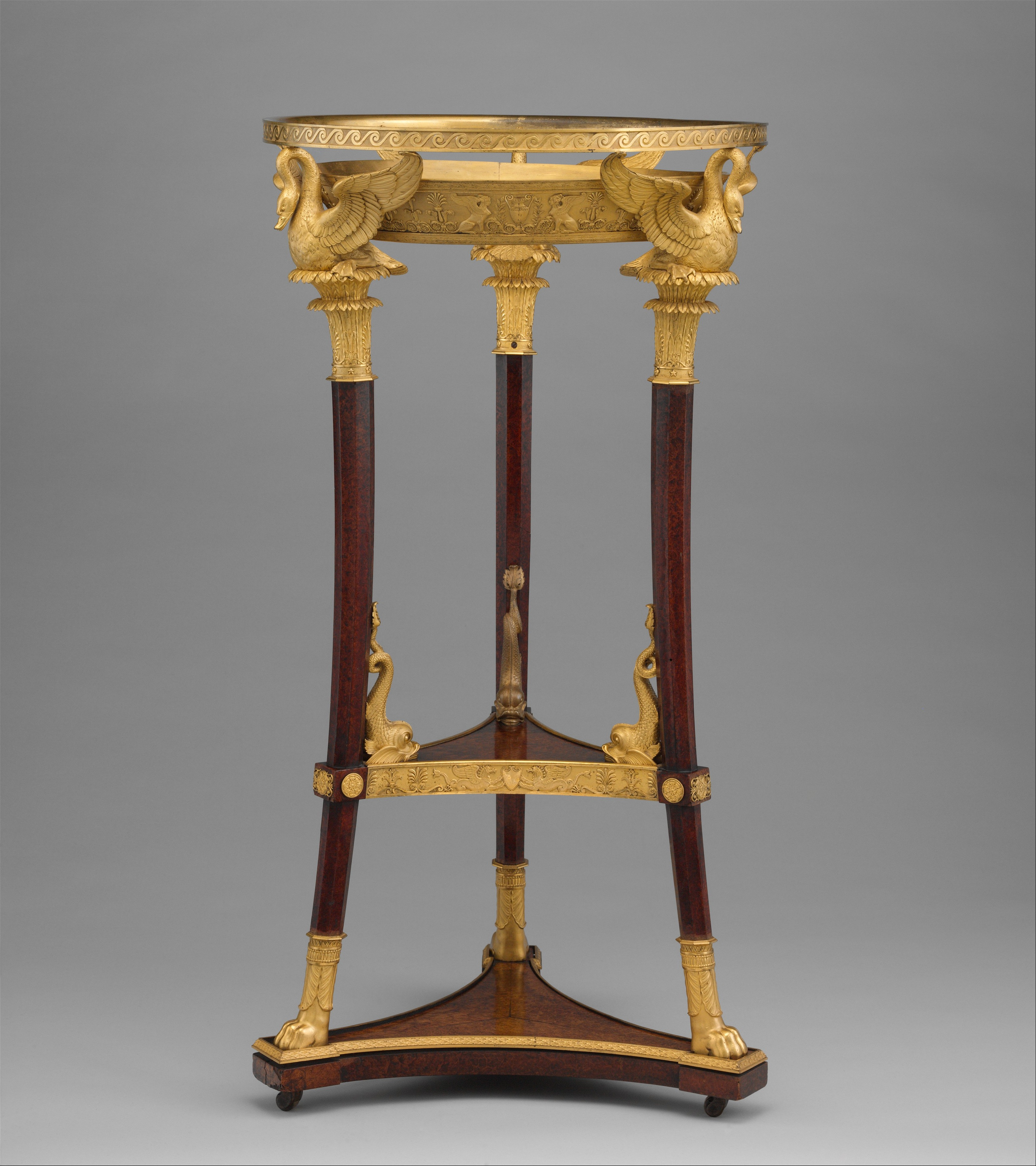
Washstand (athénienne or lavabo); 1800–1814; legs, base and shelf of yew wood, gilt-bronze mounts, iron plate beneath shelf; height: 92.4 cm, width: 49.5 cm; Metropolitan Museum of Art

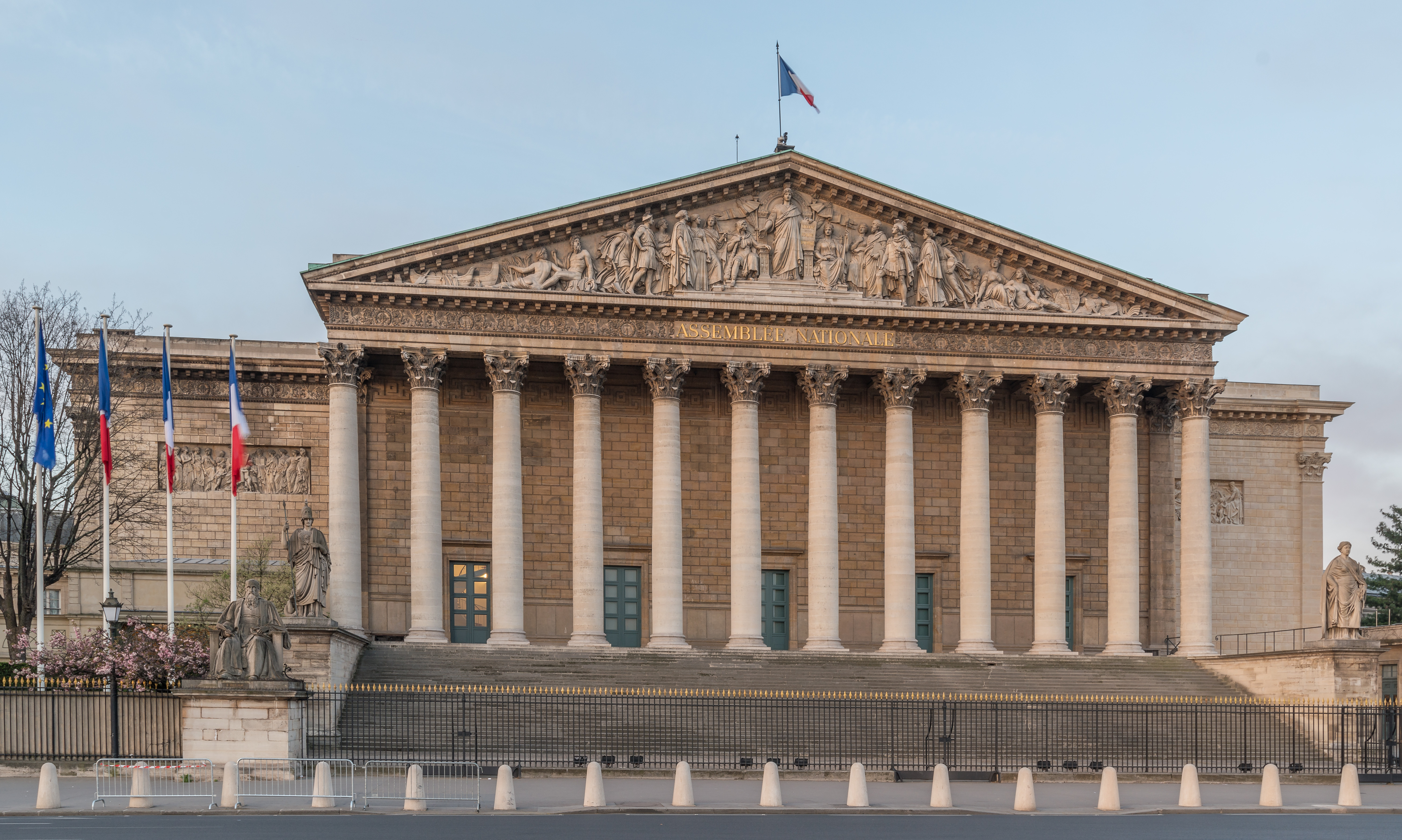
Portico of the Palais Bourbon, Paris, by Bernard Poyet, 1806-1808

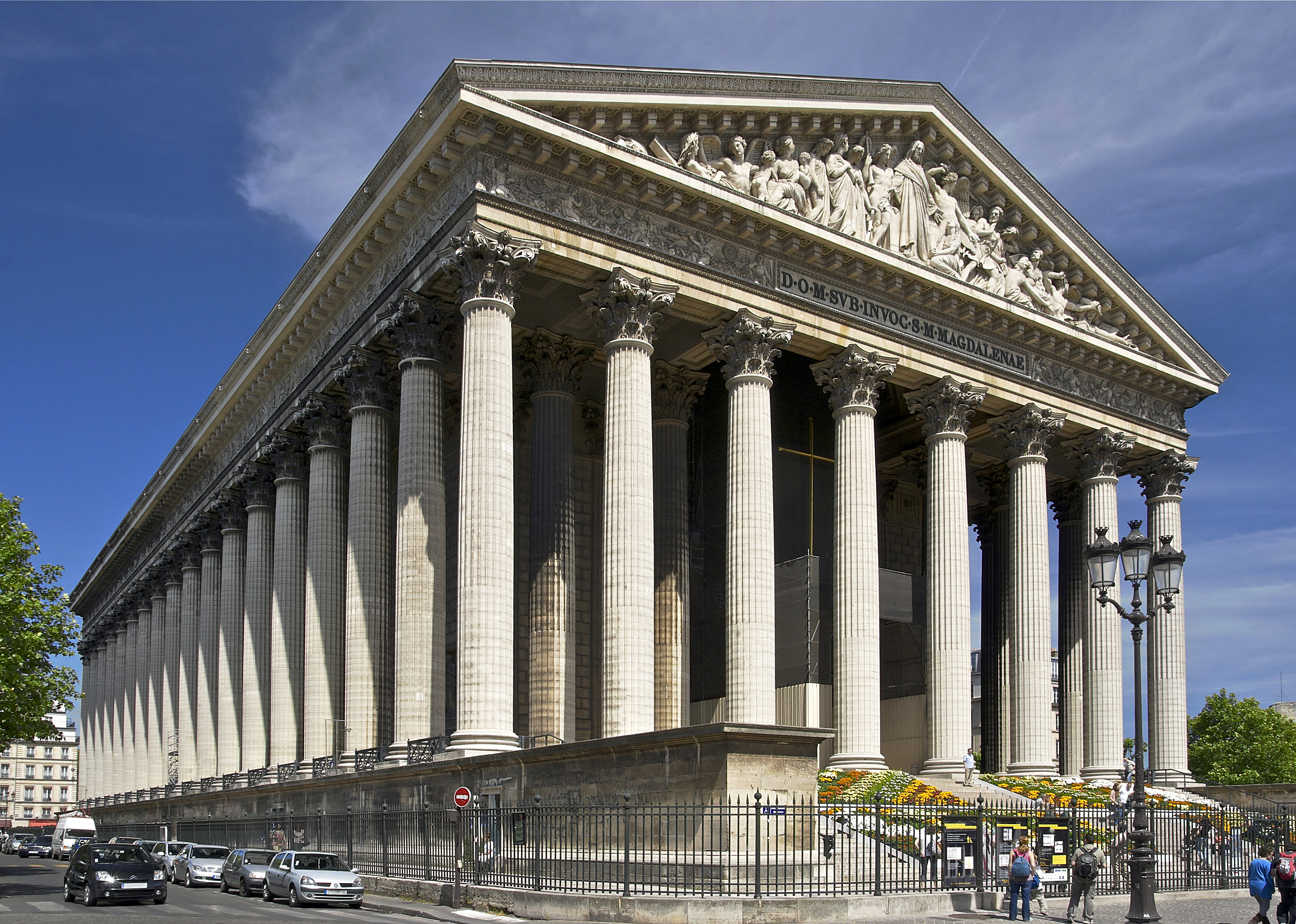
La Madeleine, Paris, by Pierre-Alexandre Vignon, 1807-1842

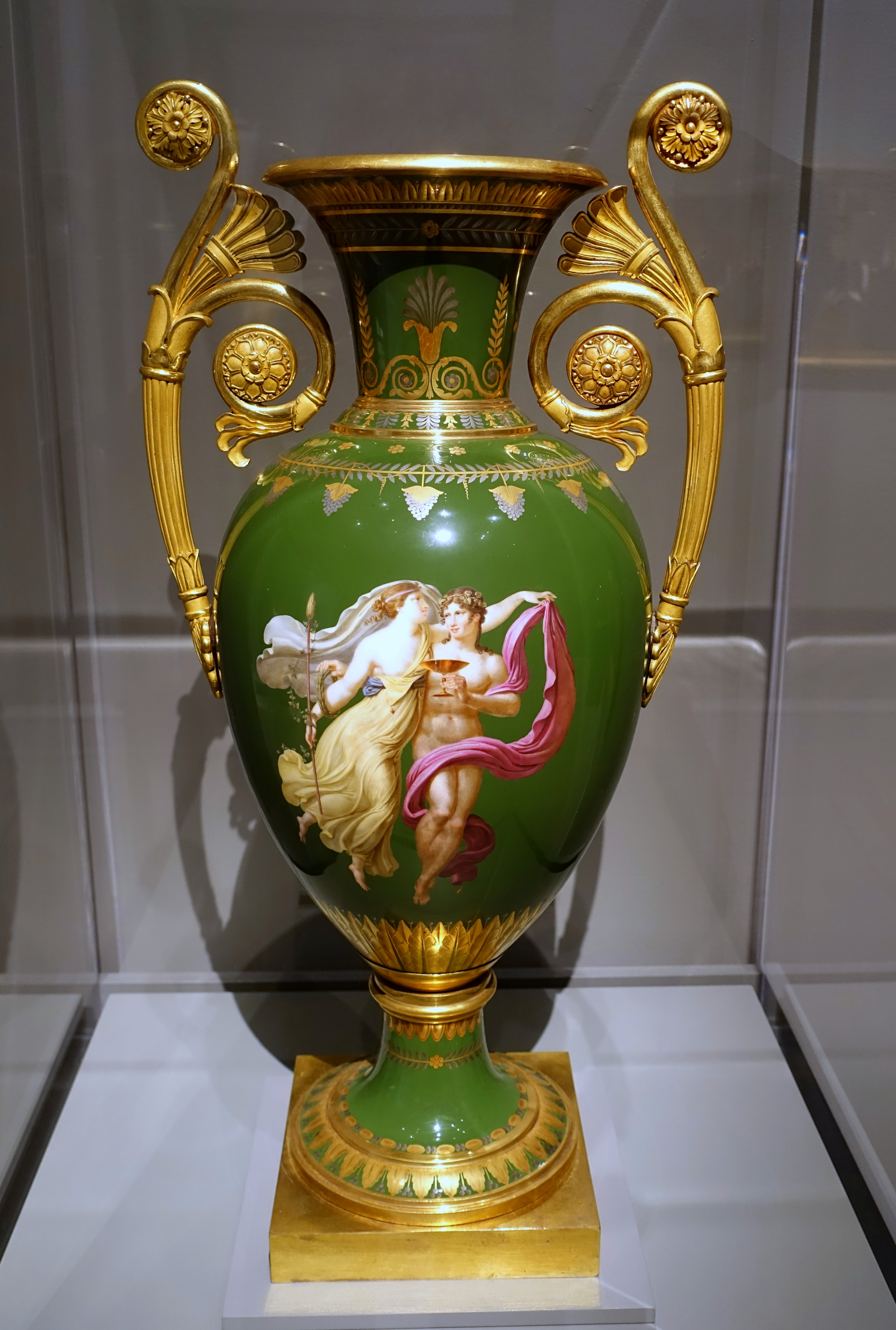
Vase; 1809; hard-paste porcelain and gilded bronze handles; height: 74.9 cm, diameter: 35.6 cm; Wadsworth Atheneum, Hartford, Connecticut, US

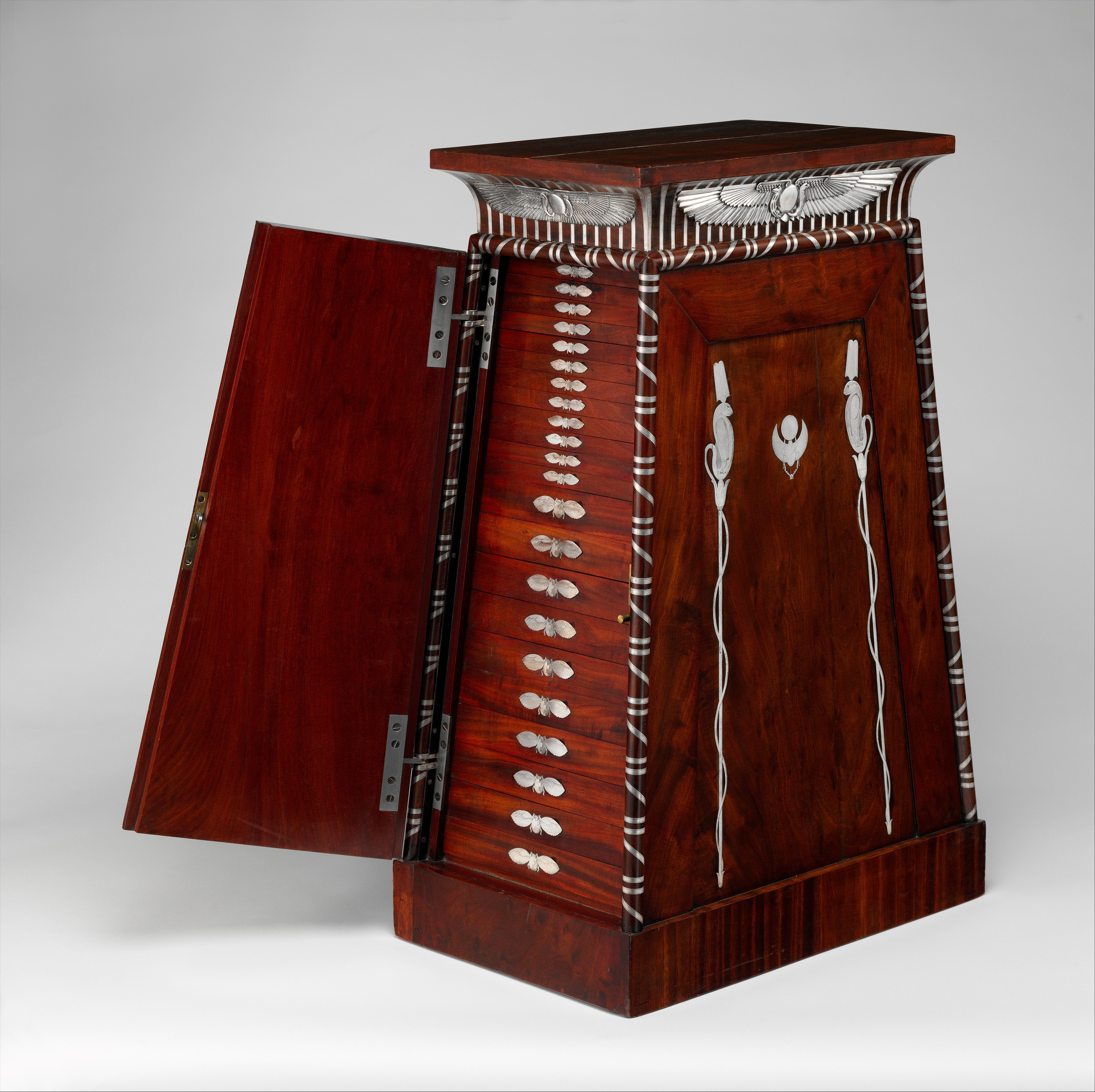
Egyptian Revival coin cabinet; by François-Honoré-Georges Jacob-Desmalter; 1809–1819; mahogany (probably Swietenia mahagoni), with applied and inlaid silver; 90.2 x 50.2 x 37.5 cm; Metropolitan Museum of Art

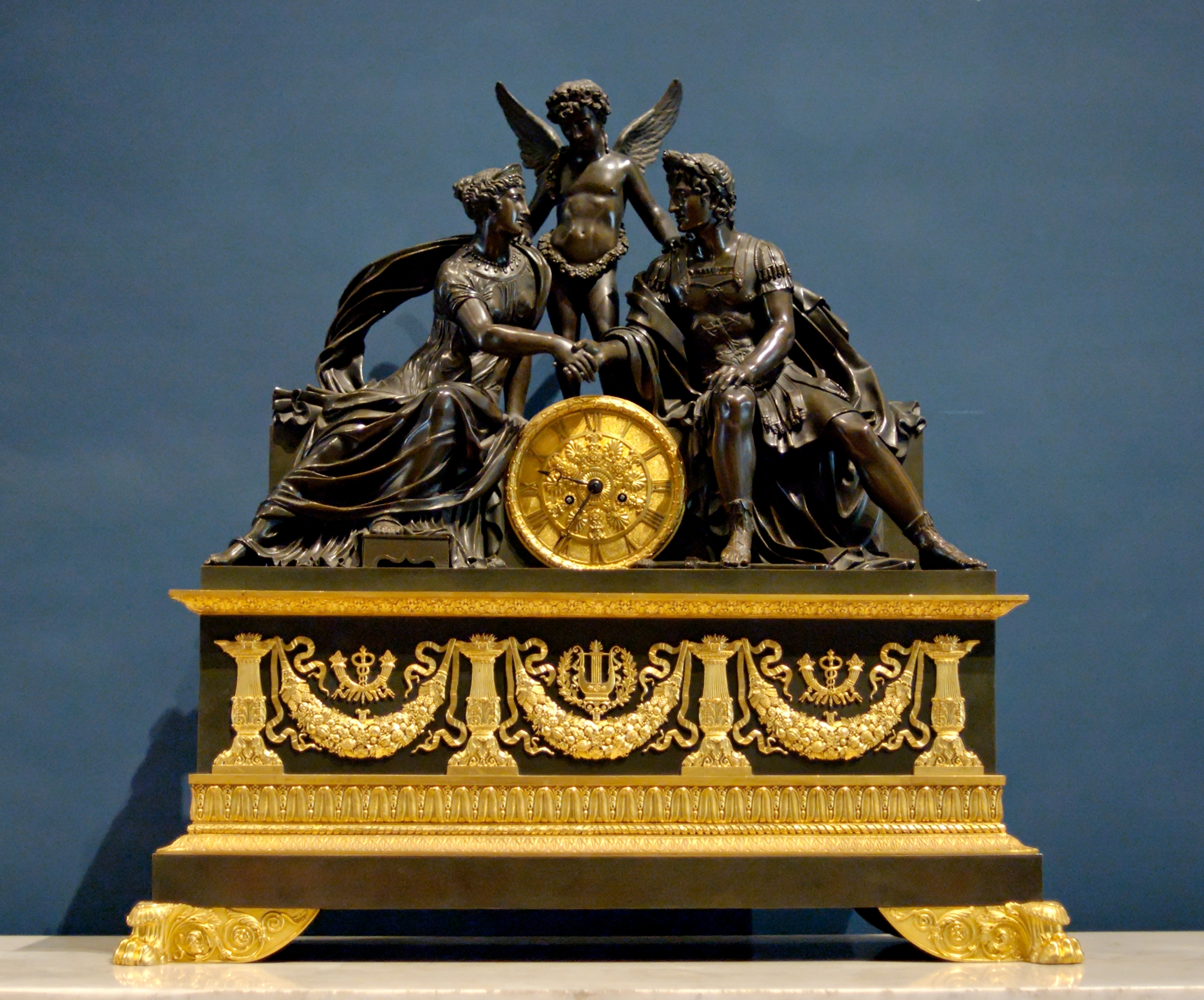
Clock with Mars and Venus; c. 1810; gilded bronze and patina; height: 90 cm; Louvre

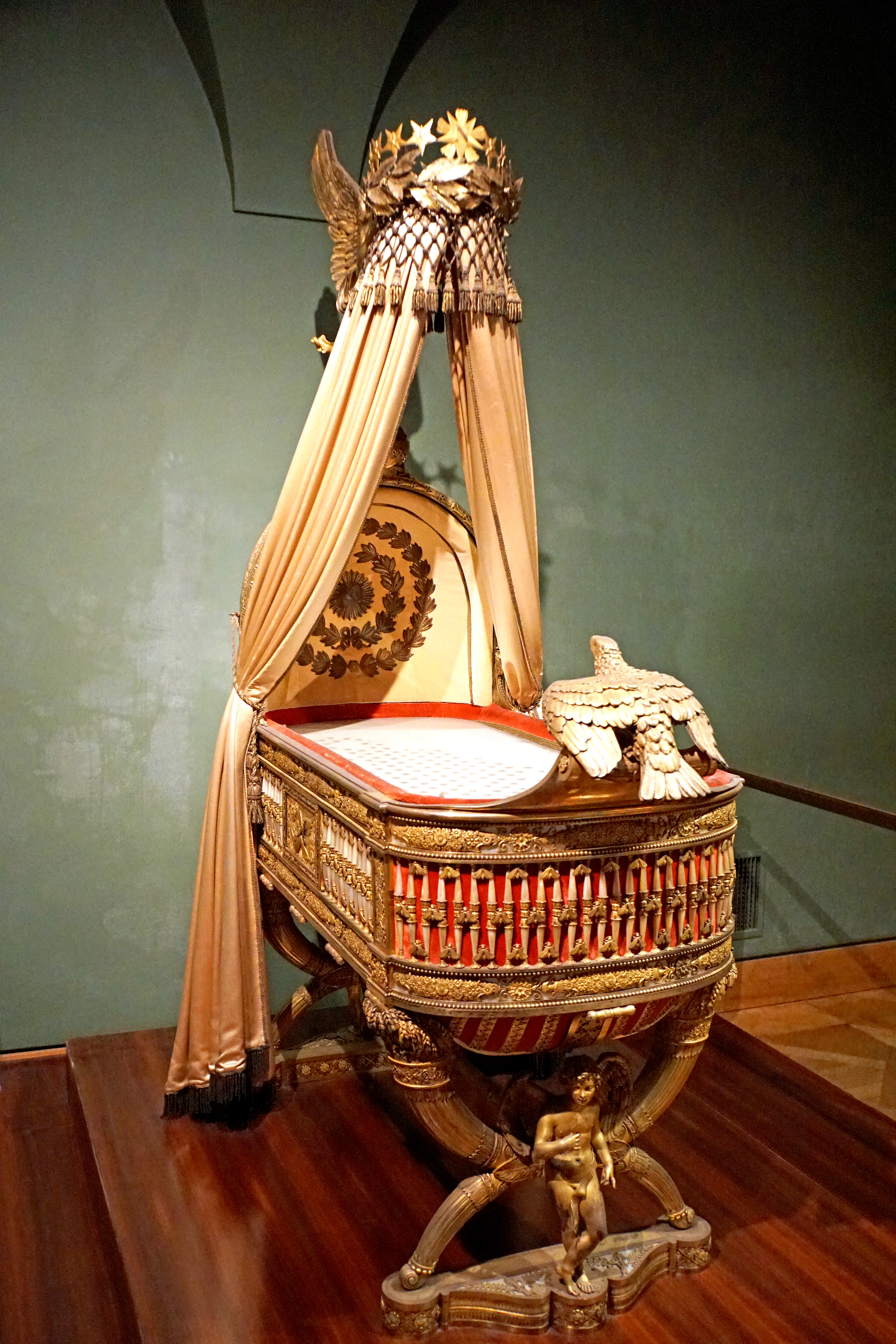
King of Rome's Cradle; by Pierre-Paul Prud'hon, Henri Victor Roguier, Jean-Baptiste-Claude Odiot and Pierre-Philippe Thomire; 1811; wood, silver gilt, mother-of-pearl, sheets of copper covered with velvet, silk and tulle, decorated with silver and gold thread; height: 216 cm; Kunsthistorisches Museum, Vienna, Austria

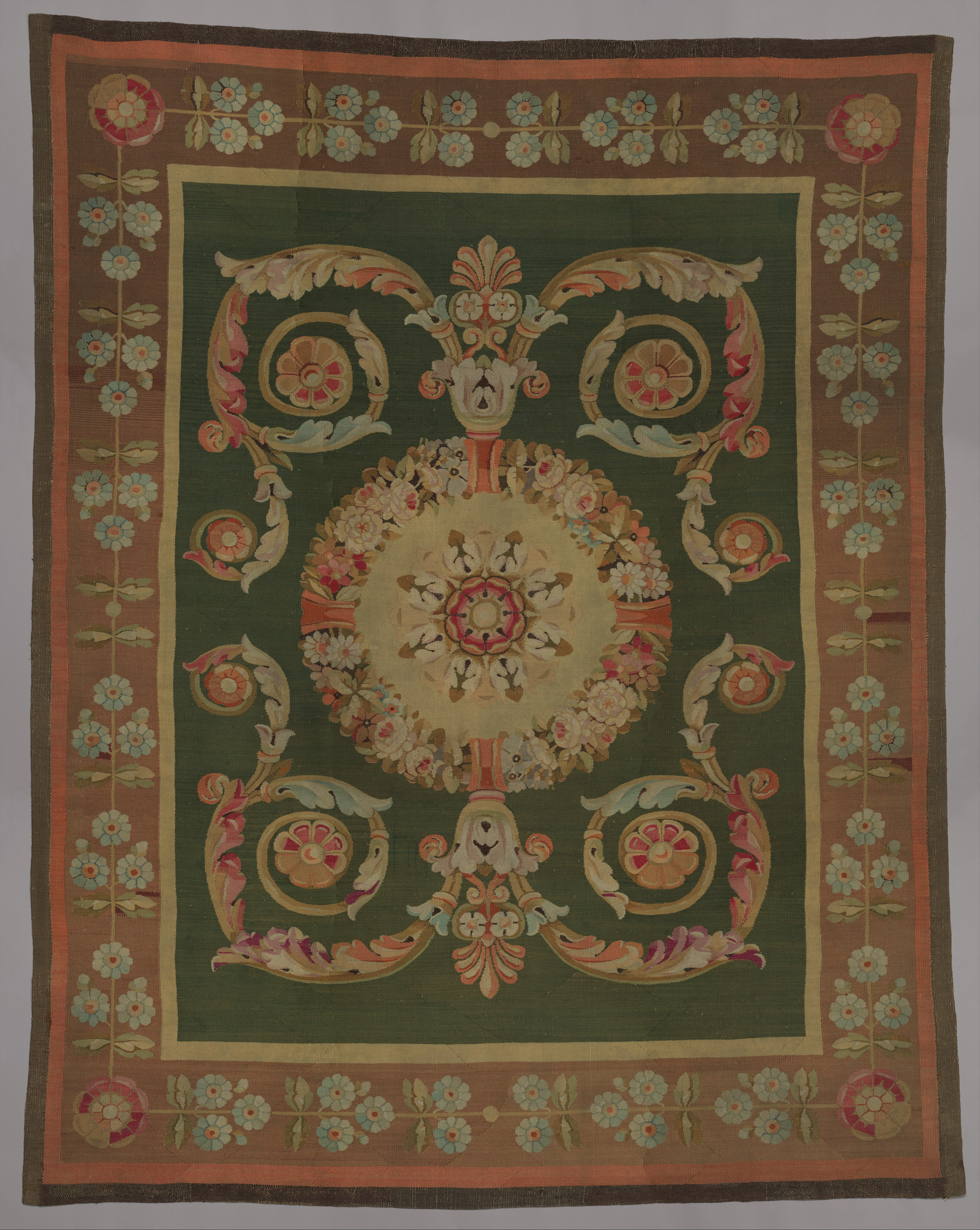
Carpet; 1814–1830; 309.9 × 246.4 cm; Metropolitan Museum of Art

Neoclassicism was representative for the new French society that exited the revolution, setting the tone in all life fields, including art. The Jacquard machine was invented during this period (which revolutionised the entire sewing system, manual until then). One of the dominant colours was red, decorated with gilt bronze. Bright colours were also used, including white, cream, violet, brown, blue, dark red, with little ornaments of gilt bronze. Interior architecture included wood panels decorated with gilt reliefs (on a white background or a coloured one). Motifs were placed geometrically. The walls were covered in stuccos, wallpaper fabrics. Fireplace mantels were made of white marble, having caryatids at their corners, or other elements: obelisks, sphinxes, winged lions, and so on. Bronze objects were placed on their tops, including mantel clocks. The doors consisted of simple rectangular panels, decorated with a Pompeian-inspired central figure. Empire fabrics are damasks with a blue or brown background, satins with a green, pink or purple background, velvets of the same colors, brooches broached with gold or silver, and cotton fabrics. All of these were used in interiors for curtains, for covering certain furniture, for cushions or upholstery (leather was also used for upholstery).

All Empire ornament is governed by a rigorous spirit of symmetry reminiscent of the Louis XIV style. Generally, the motifs on a piece's right and left sides correspond to one another in every detail; when they do not, the individual motifs themselves are entirely symmetrical in composition: antique heads with identical tresses falling onto each shoulder, frontal figures of Victory with symmetrically arrayed tunics, identical rosettes or swans flanking a lock plate, etc. Like Louis XIV, Napoleon had a set of emblems unmistakably associated with his rule, most notably the eagle, the bee, stars, and the initials I (for Imperator) and N (for Napoleon), which were usually inscribed within an imperial laurel crown. Motifs used include: figures of Victory bearing palm branches, Greek dancers, nude and draped women, figures of antique chariots, winged putti, mascarons of Apollo, Hermes and the Gorgon, swans, lions, the heads of oxen, horses and wild beasts, butterflies, claws, winged chimeras, sphinxes, bucrania, sea horses, oak wreaths knotted by thin trailing ribbons, climbing grape vines, poppy rinceaux, rosettes, palm branches, and laurel. There's a lot of Greco-Roman ones: stiff and flat acanthus leaves, palmettes, cornucopias, beads, amphoras, tripods, imbricated disks, caduceuses of Mercury, vases, helmets, burning torches, winged trumpet players, and ancient musical instruments (tubas, rattles and especially lyres). Despite their antique derivation, the fluting and triglyphs so prevalent under Louis XVI are abandoned. Egyptian Revival motifs are especially common at the beginning of the period: scarabs, lotus capitals, winged disks, obelisks, pyramids, figures wearing nemeses, caryatids en gaine supported by bare feet and with women Egyptian headdresses.

=== Germany ===
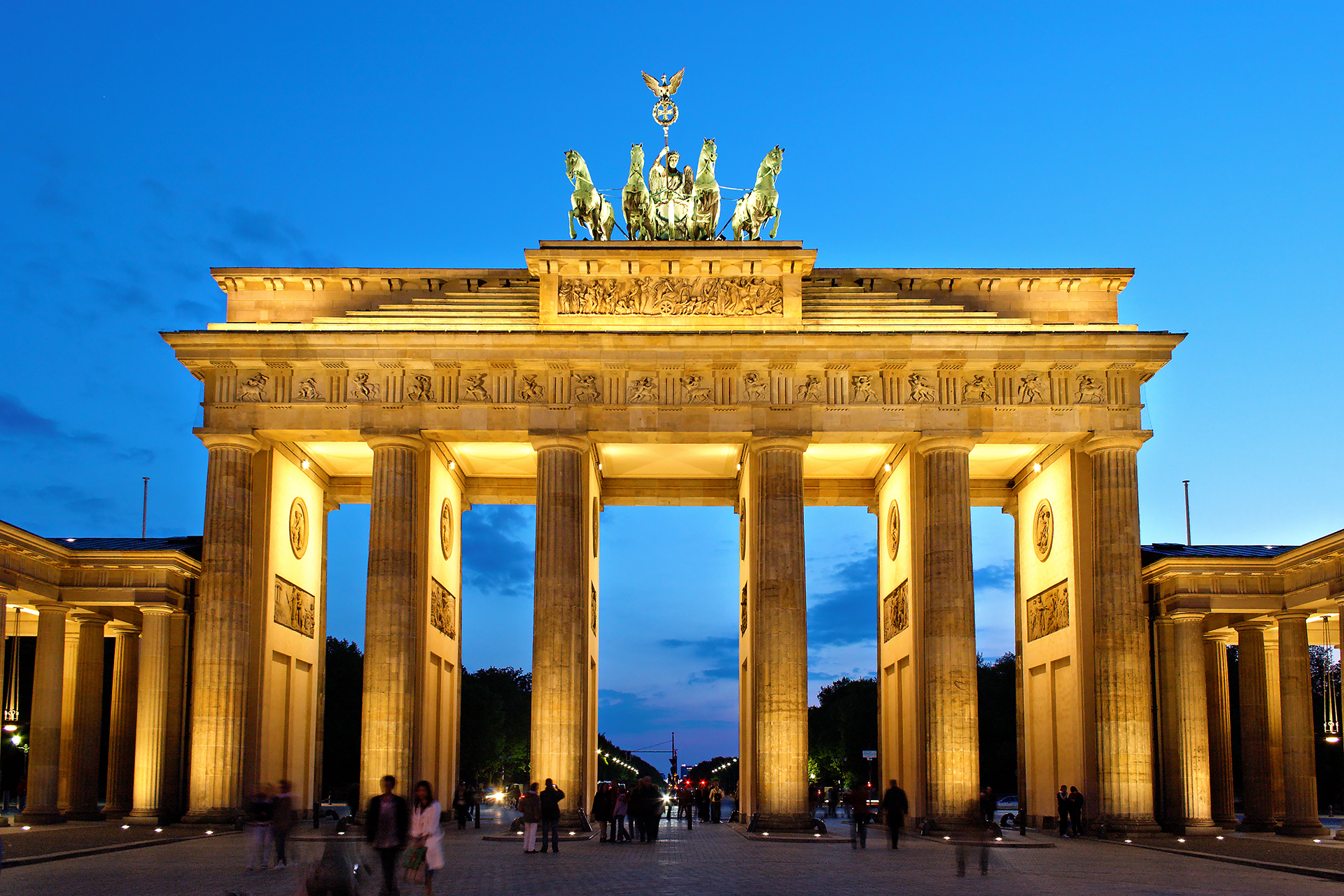
Brandenburg Gate in Berlin (1788–1791) by Carl Gotthard Langhans

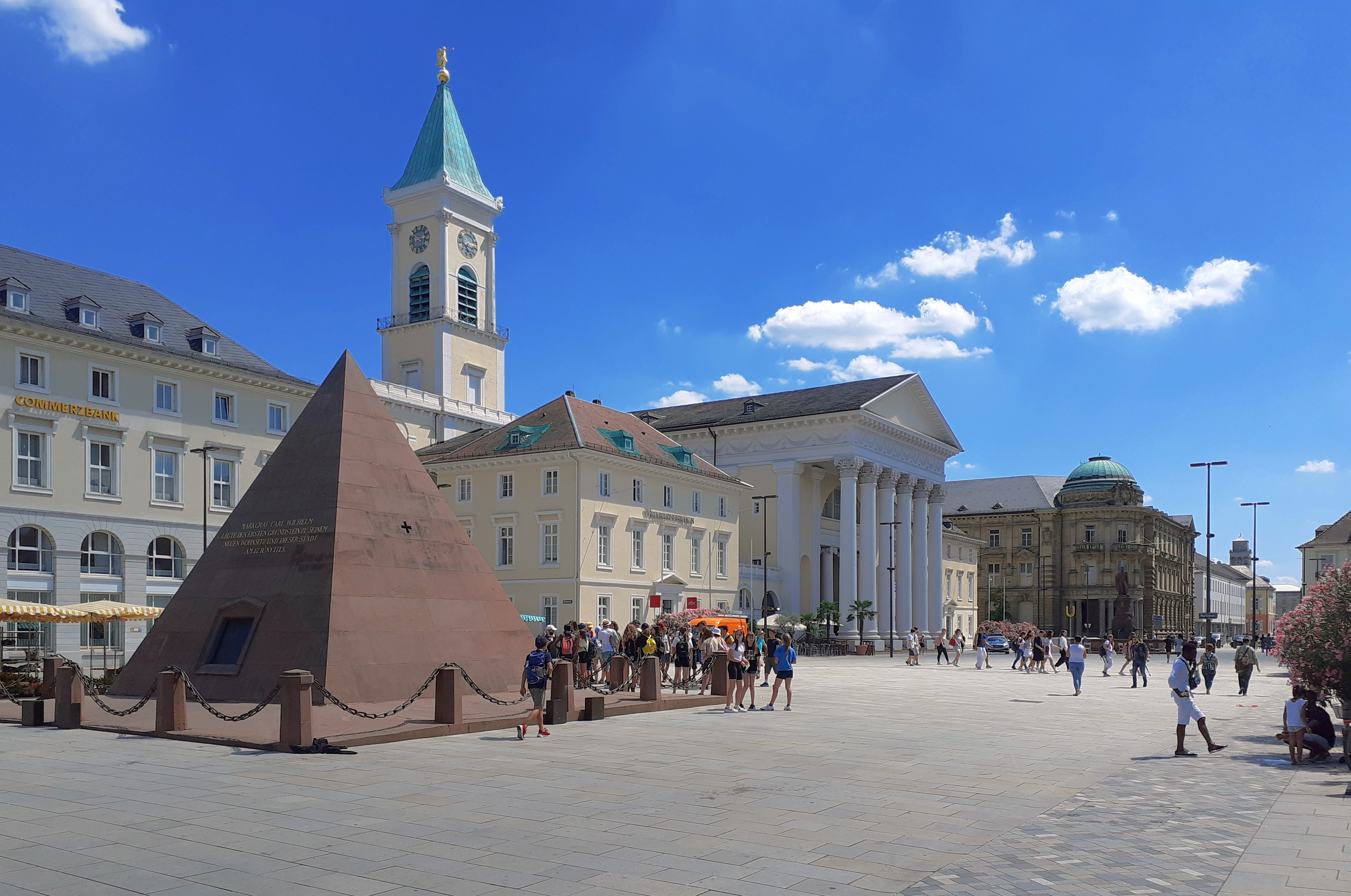
Pyramid (1823–1825) and City Church (1807–1816) in Karlsruhe by Friedrich Weinbrenner

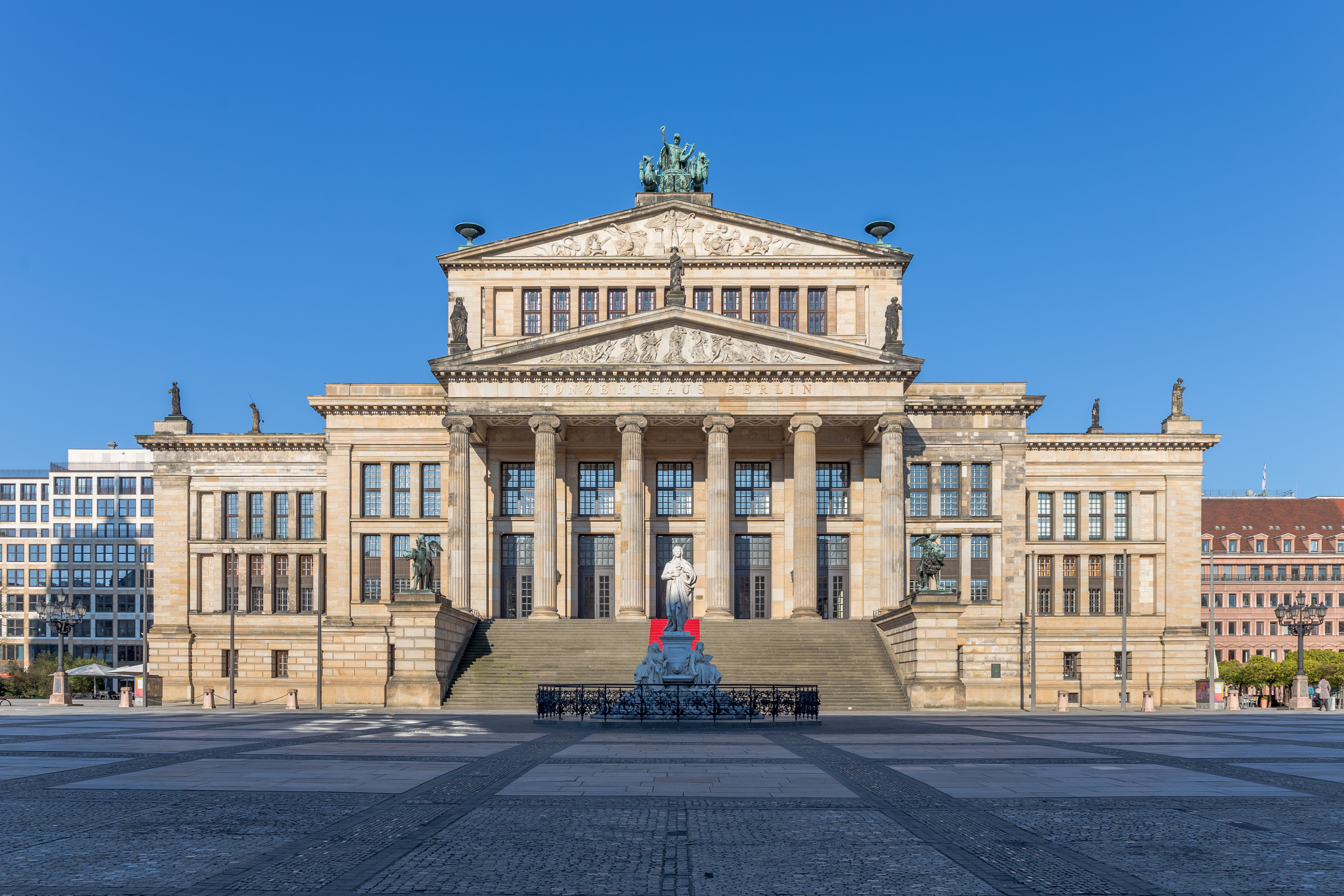
Konzerthaus Berlin in Berlin (1818–1821) by Karl Friedrich Schinkel

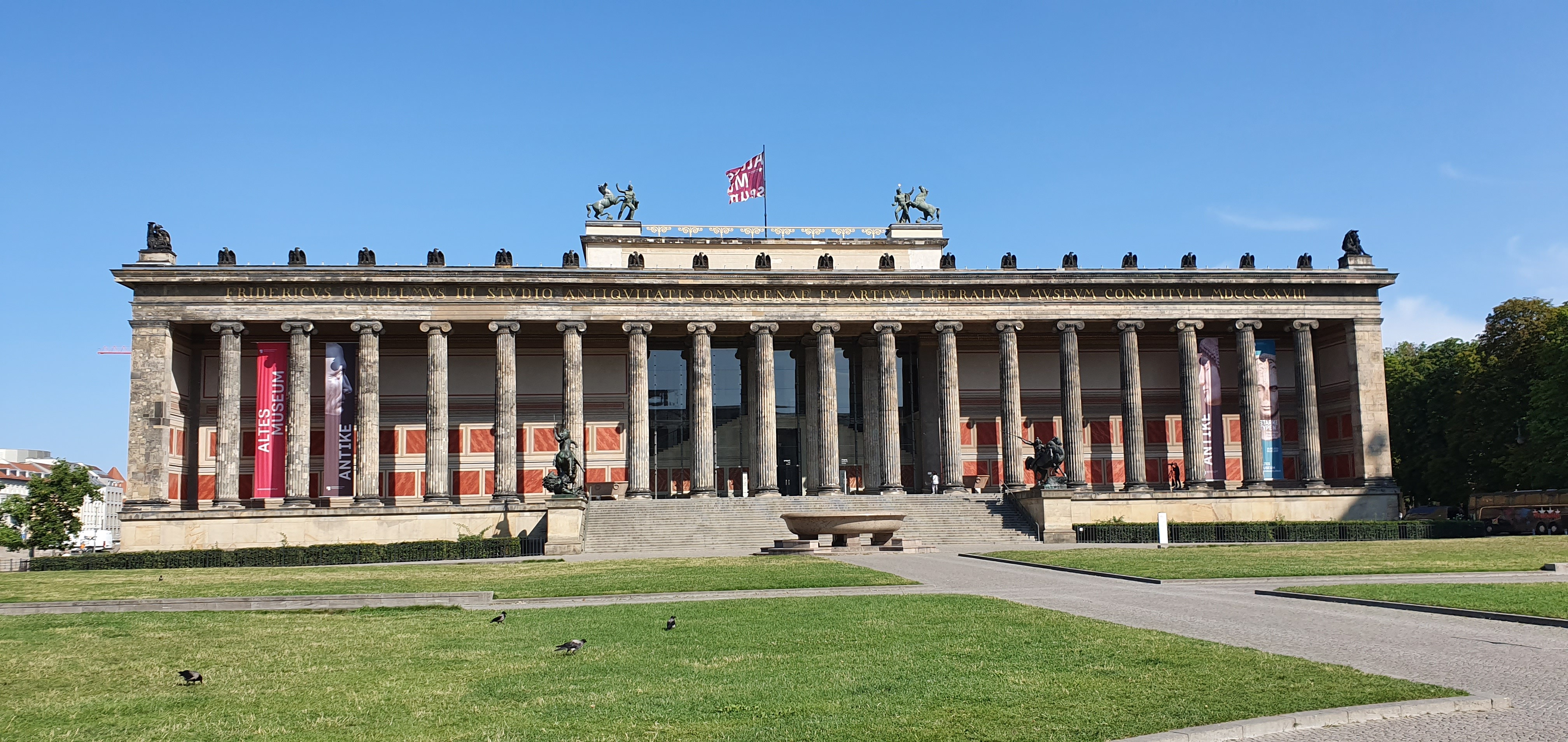
Altes Museum in Berlin (1825–1830) by Karl Friedrich Schinkel

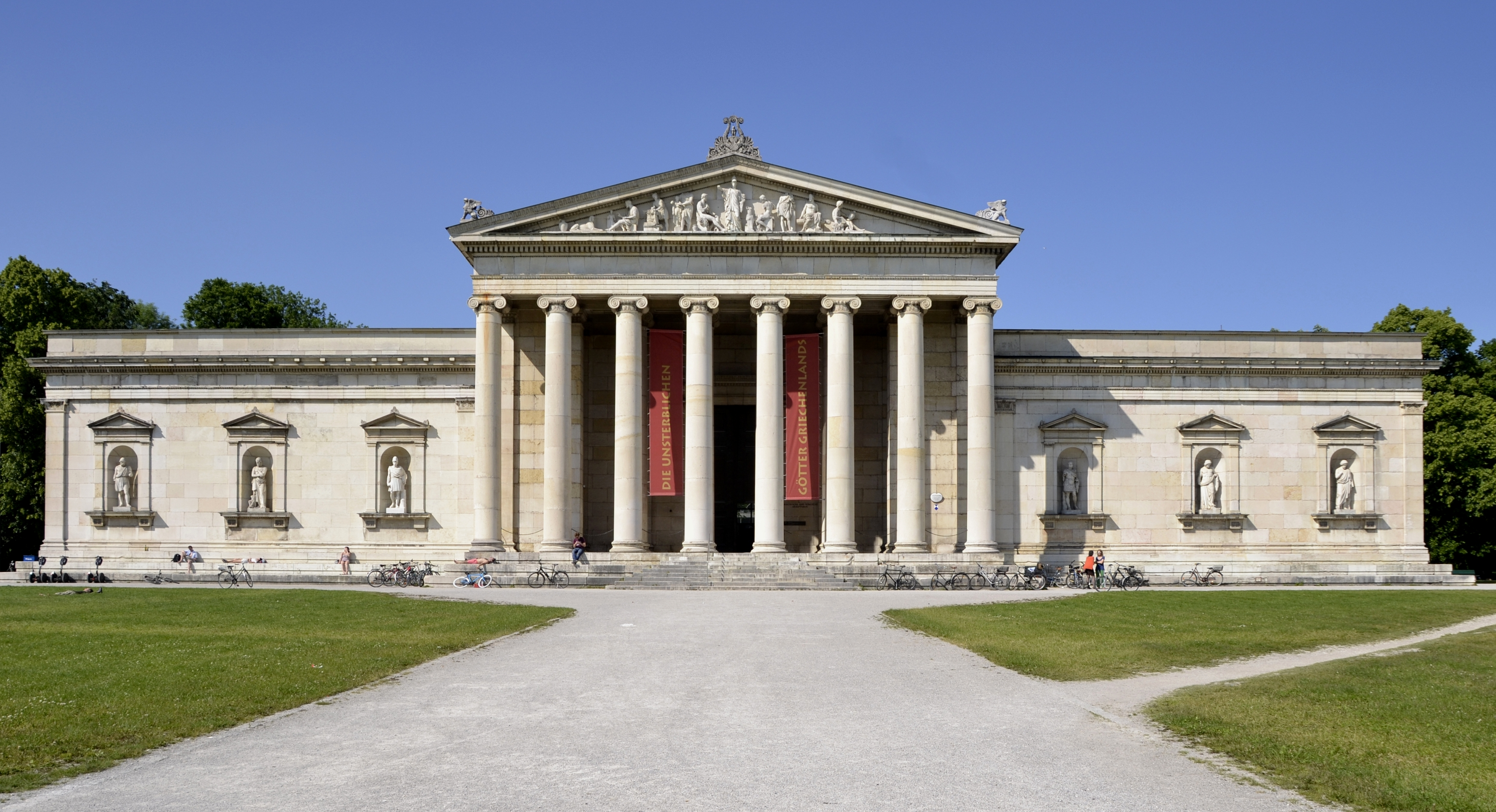
Glyptothek in Munich (1816–1830) by Leo von Klenze

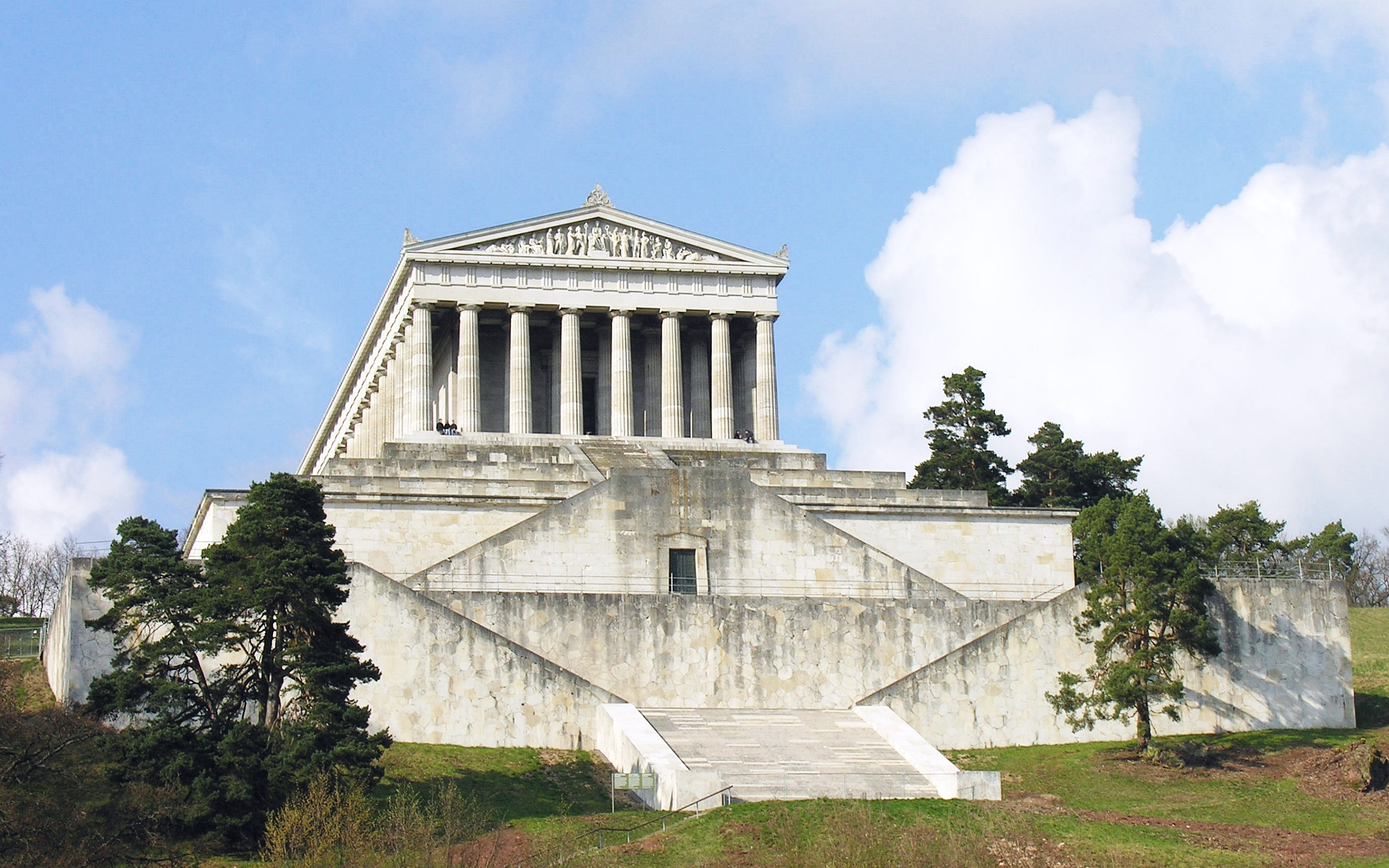
Walhalla (1830–1842) by Leo von Klenze

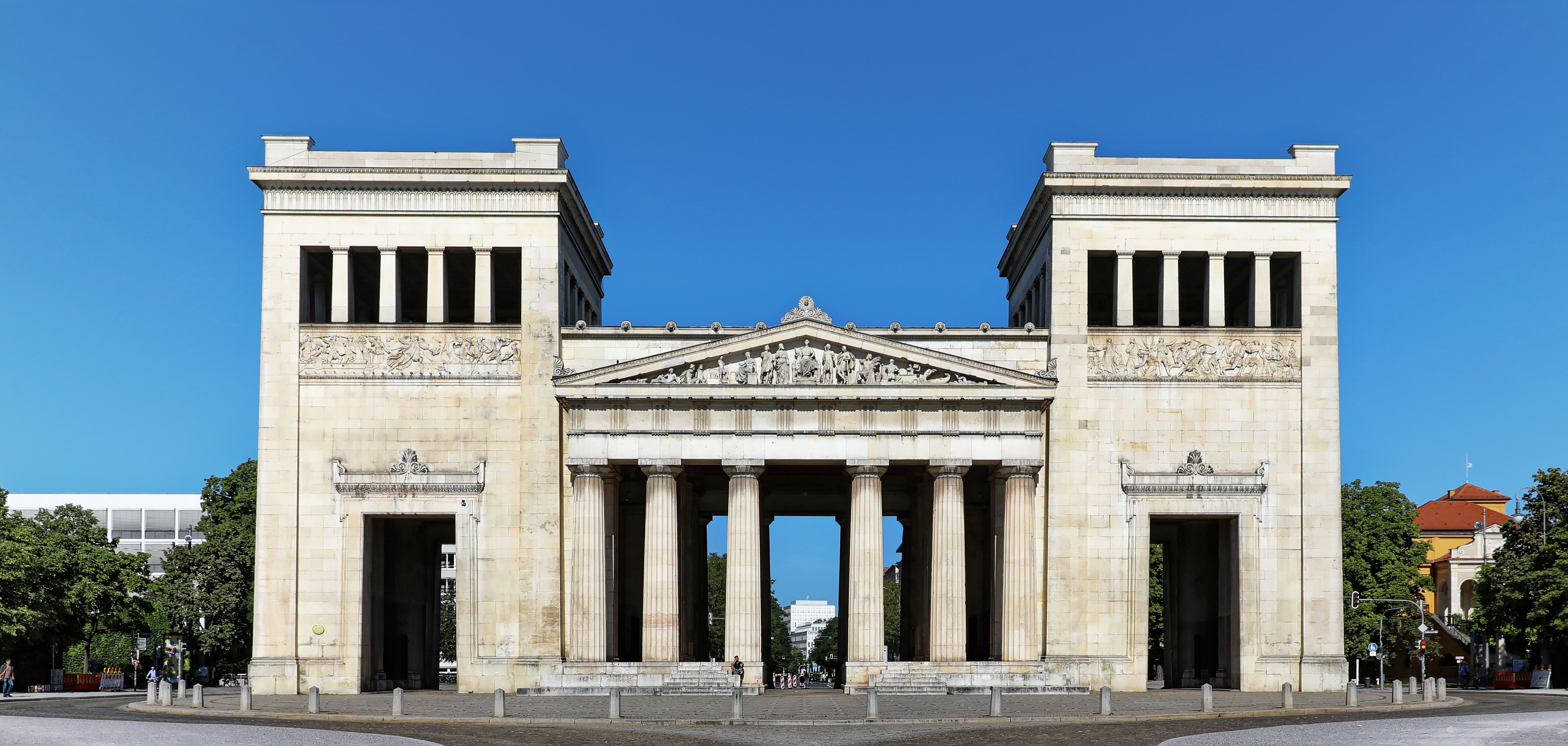
Propylaea (Munich) (1854–1862) by Leo von Klenze

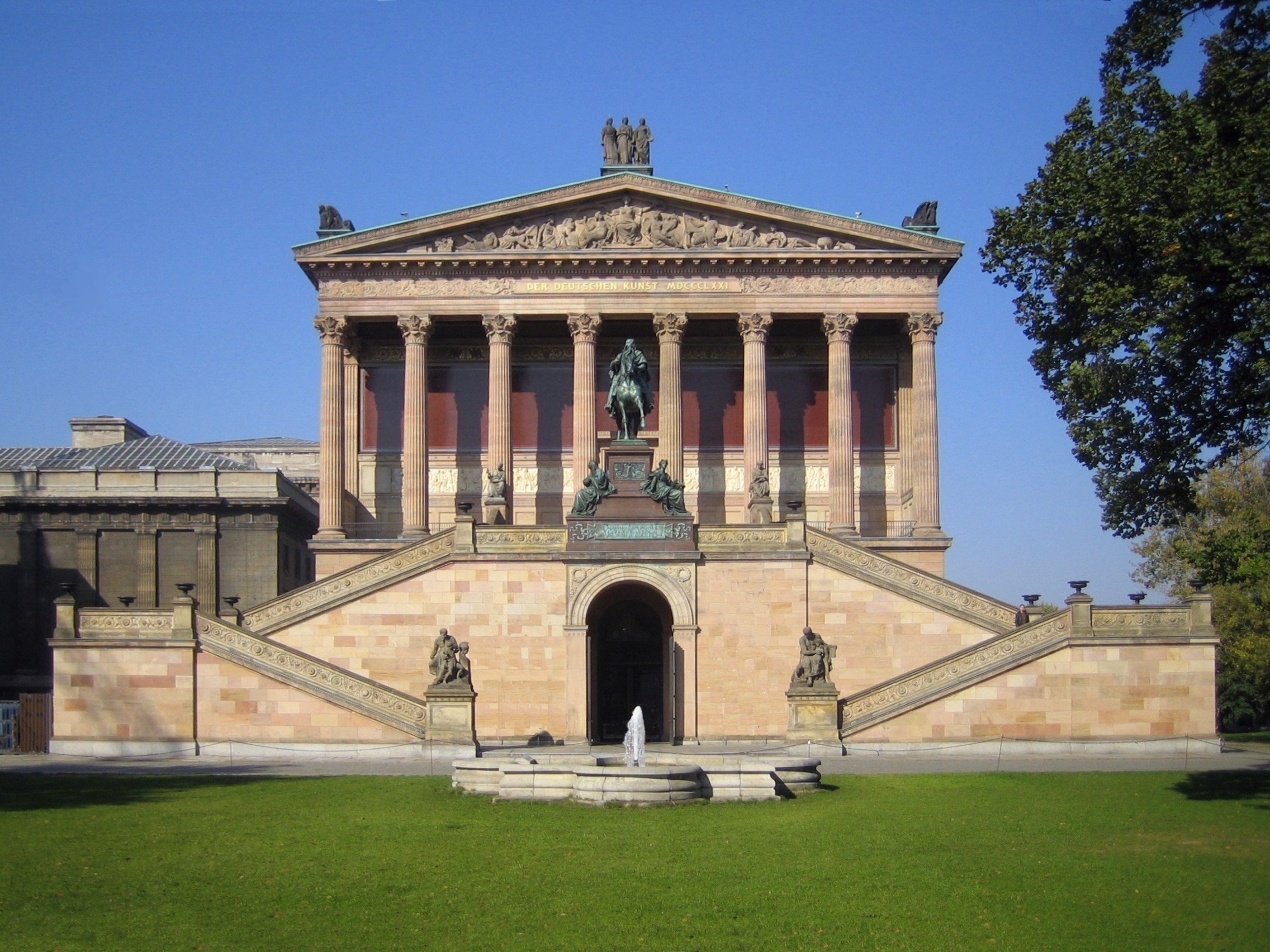
Alte Nationalgalerie in Berlin (1862–1876) by Friedrich August Stüler and Heinrich Strack

Neoclassical architecture became widespread as a symbol of wealth and power in Germany, mostly in what was then Prussia. Karl Friedrich Schinkel built many prominent buildings in this style, including the Altes Museum in Berlin. While the city remained dominated by Baroque city planning, his architecture and functional style provided the city with a distinctly neoclassical center.

His Bauakademie is considered one of the forerunners of modern architecture due to its hithertofore relatively streamlined façade of the building

=== Italy ===
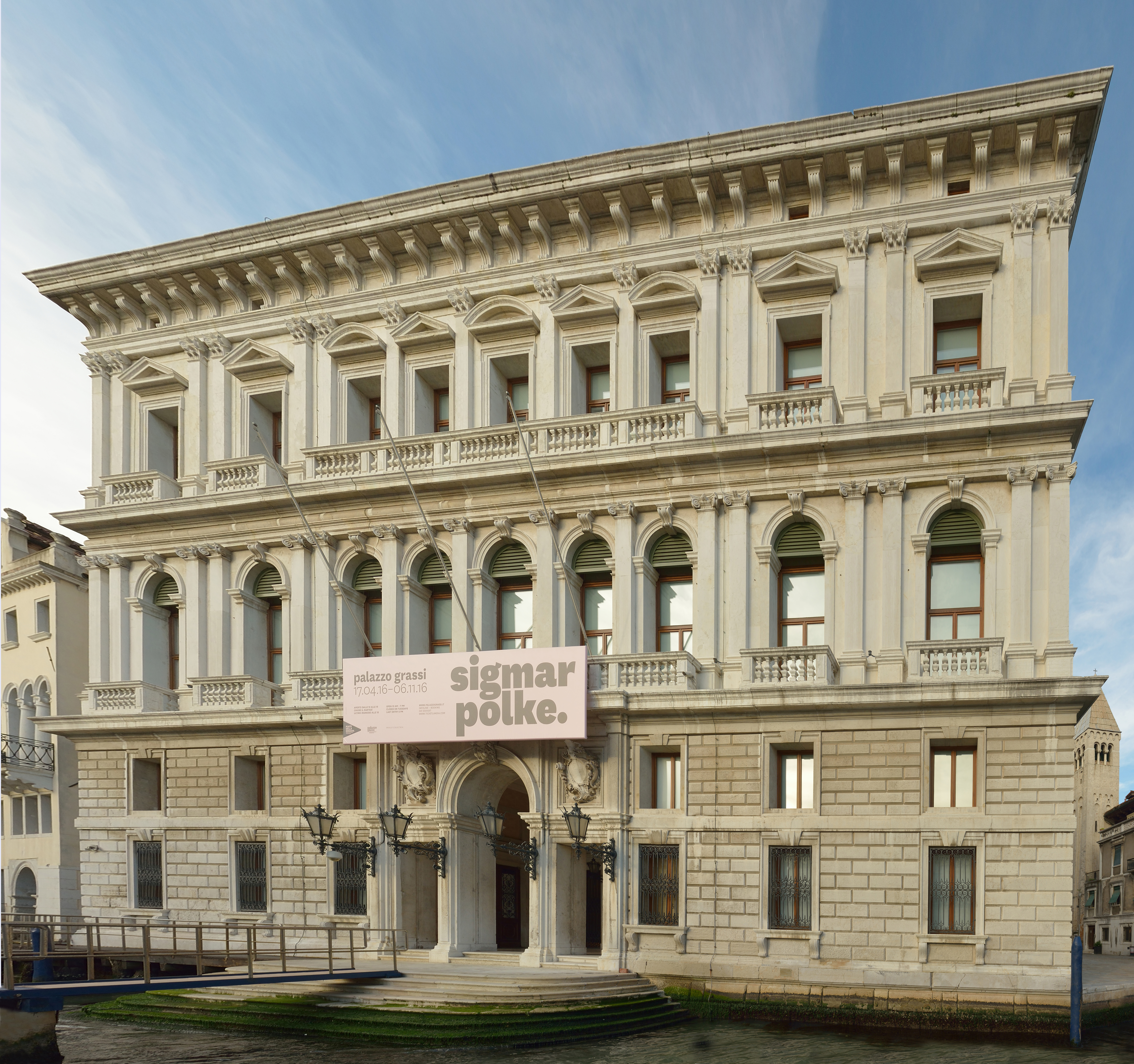
Palazzo Grassi, on the Grand Canal in Venice, by Giorgio Massari, 1748–1772

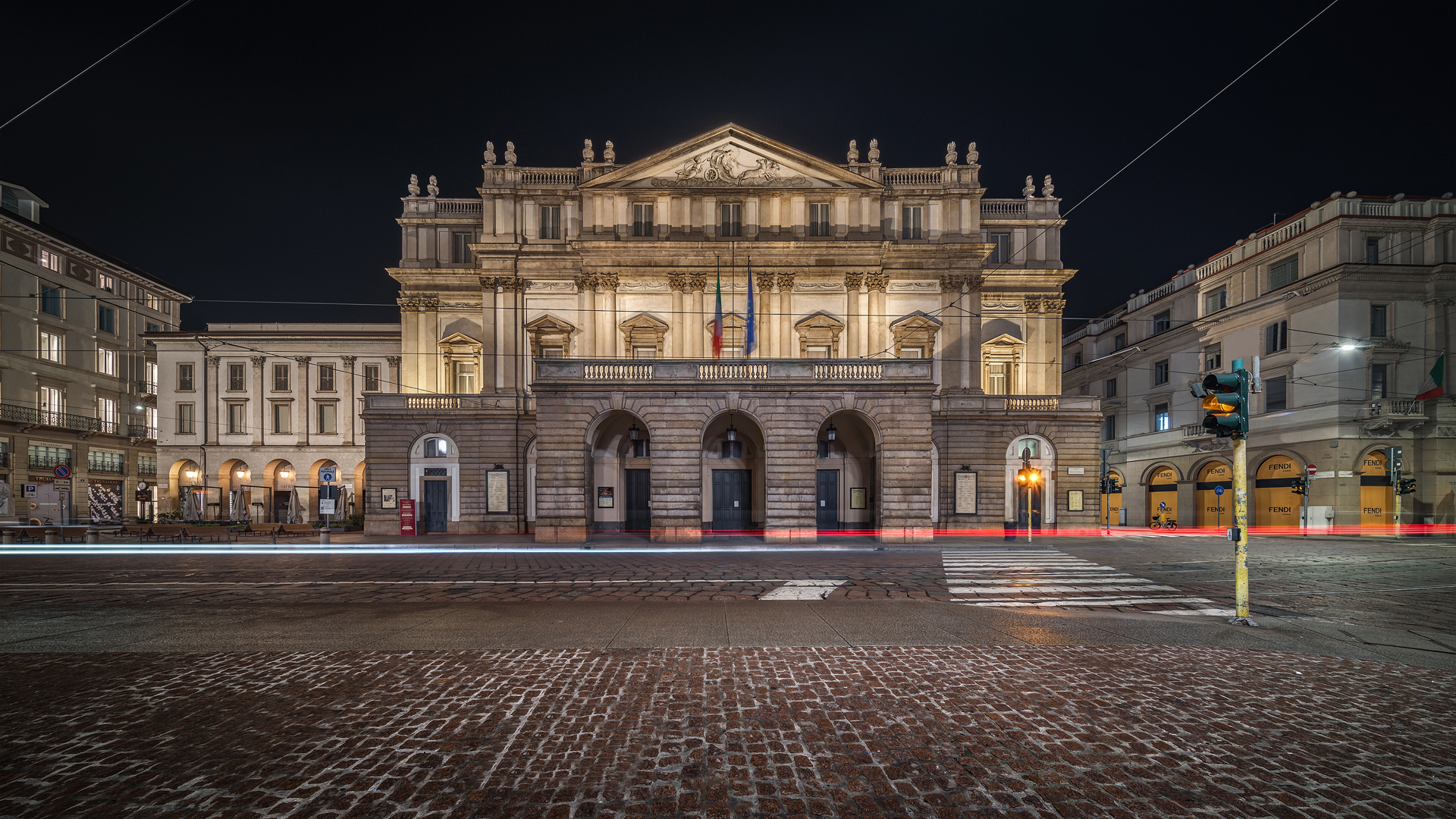
La Scala Opera House, Milan, by Giuseppe Piermarini, completed in 1778

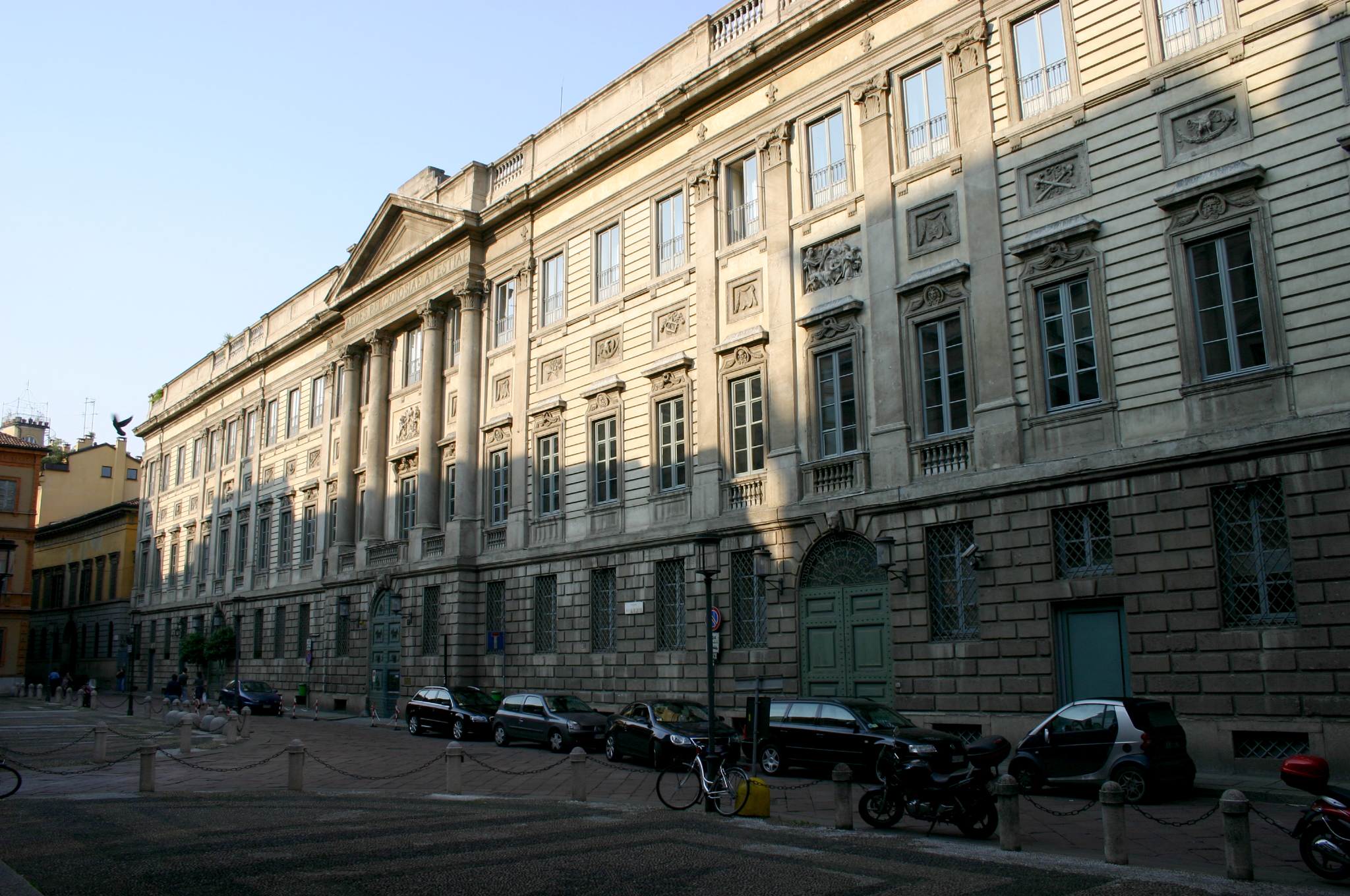
Palazzo Belgioioso, Milan, by Giuseppe Piermarini, 1781

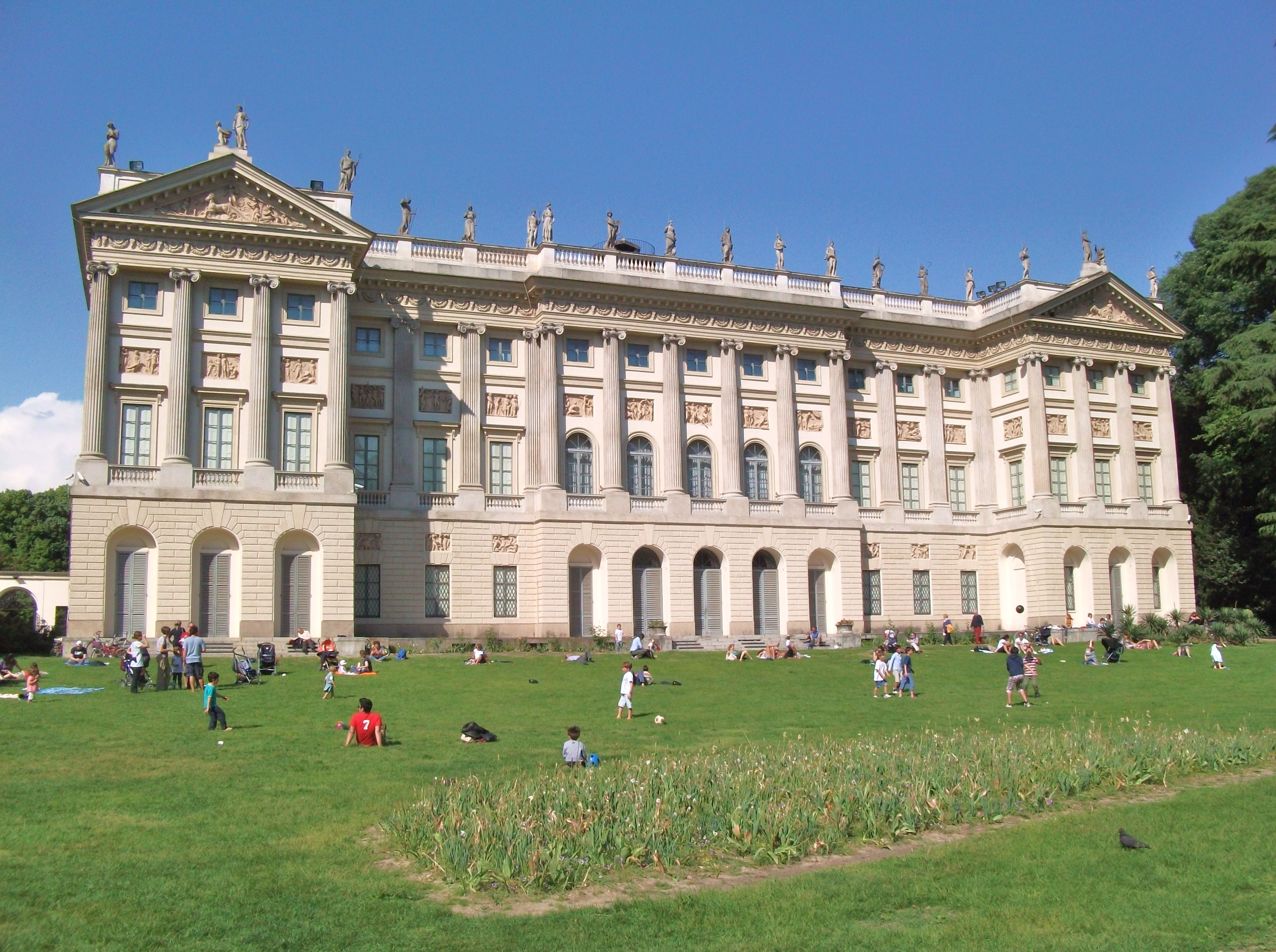
Villa Belgiojoso Bonaparte, Milan, by Leopoldo Pollack, 1790–1796

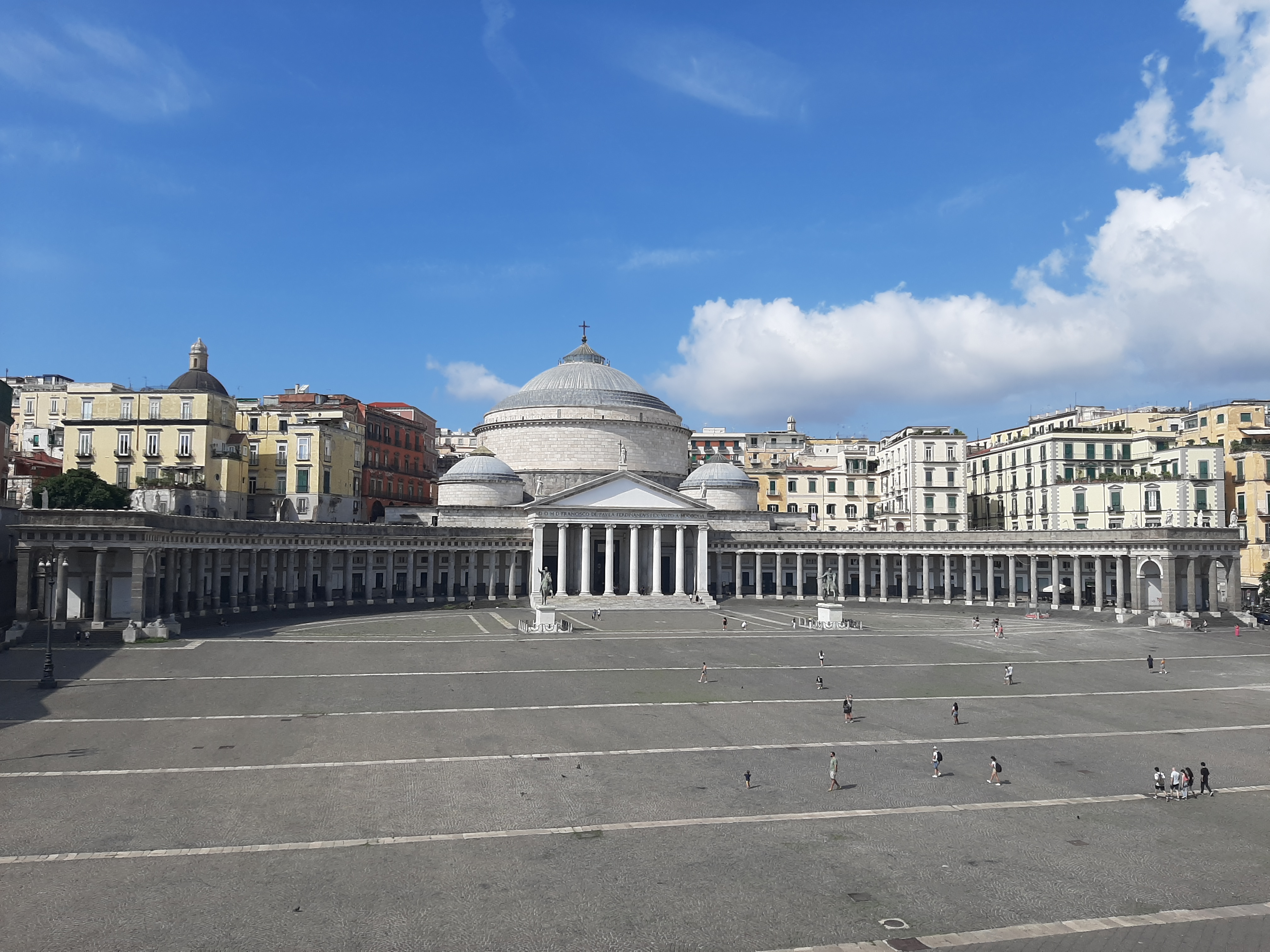
Piazza del Plebiscito, Naples, unknown architect, 1809–1846

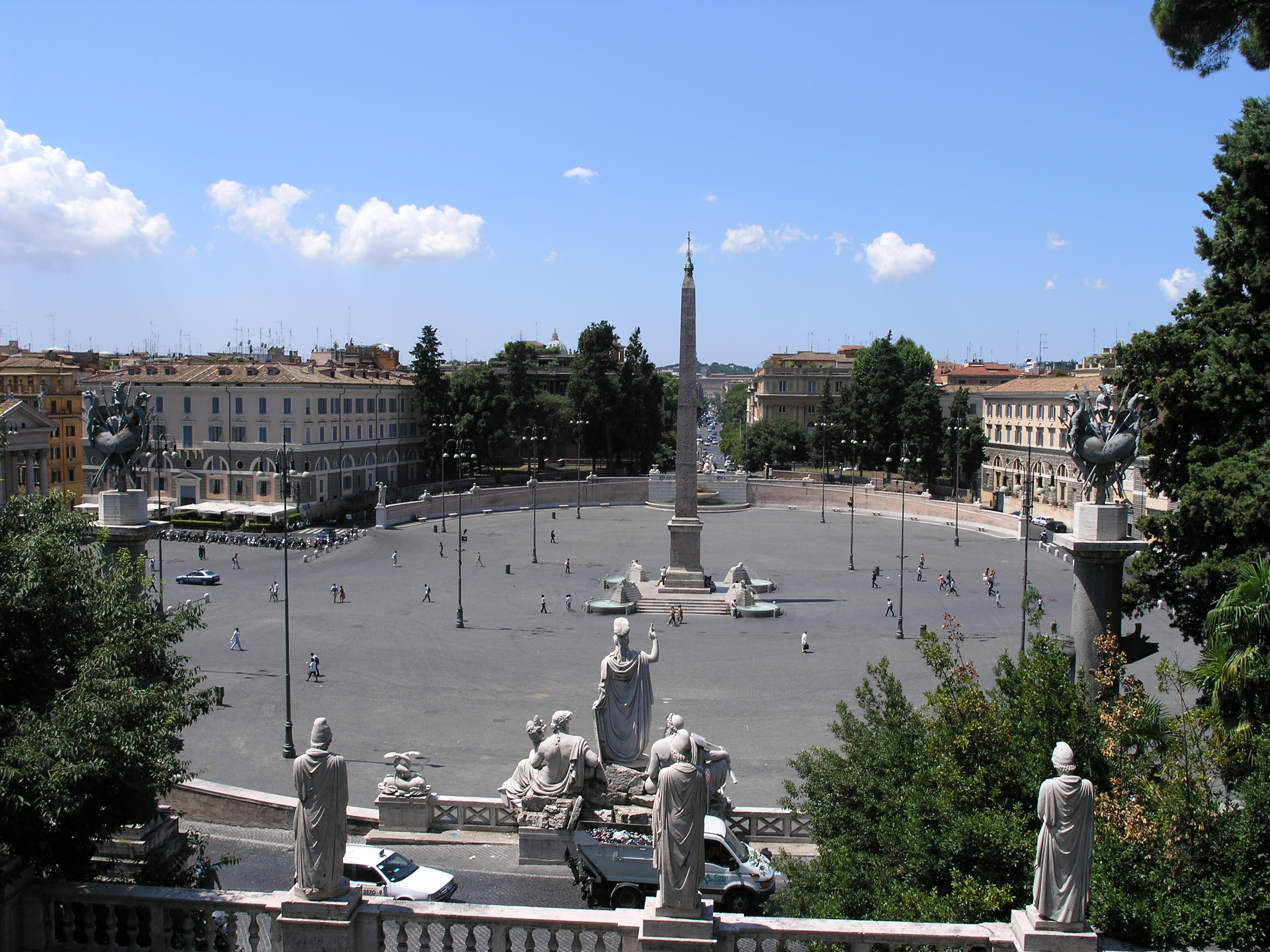
Piazza del Popolo (Rome), redesigned between 1811 and 1822, by Giuseppe Valadier

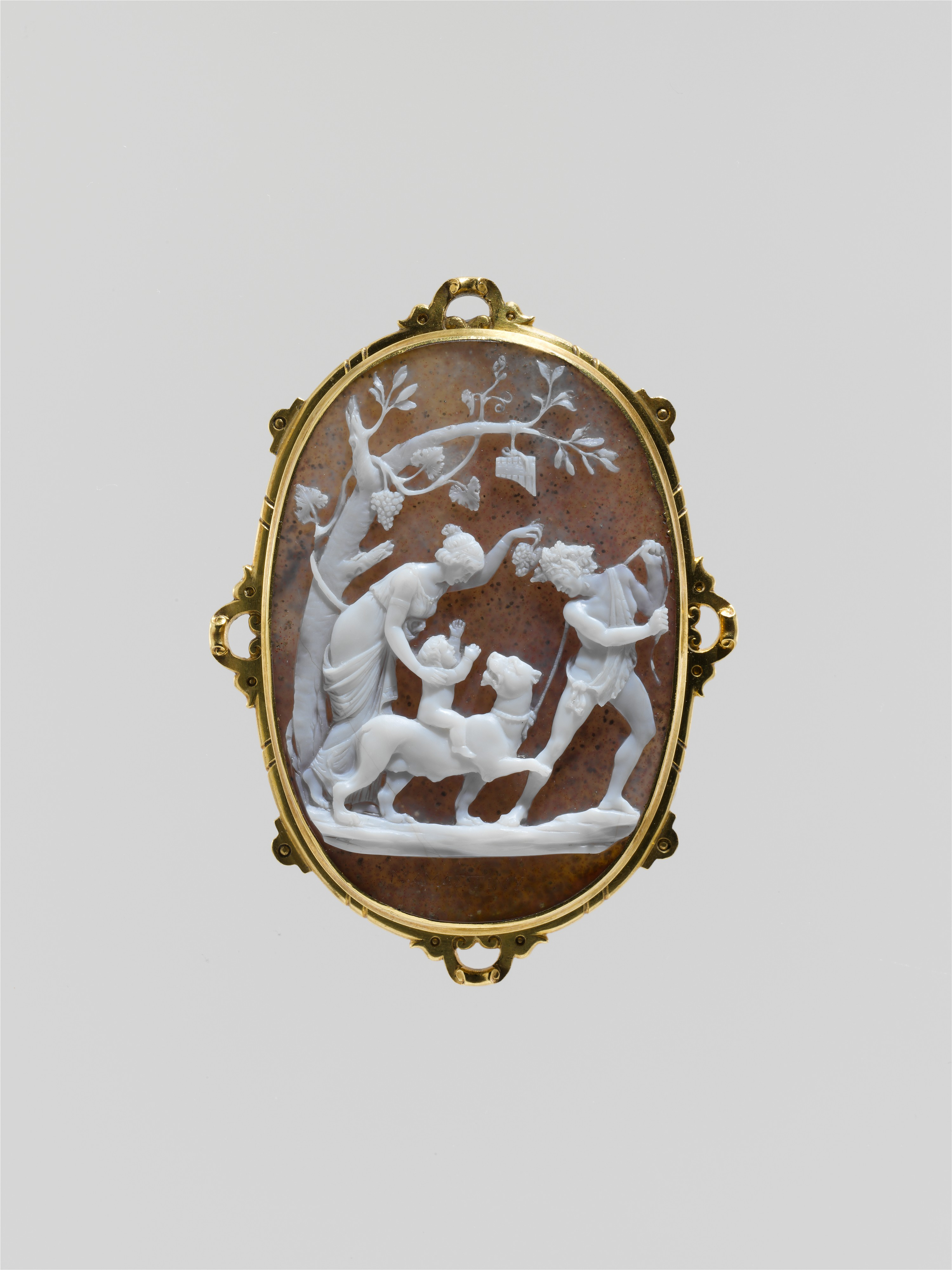
Education of the Infant Bacchus; by Niccolò Amastini; first half 19th century; onyx with gold frame; overall (in setting): 6.5 x 4.8 cm; Metropolitan Museum of Art, New York City

From the second half of the 18th century through the 19th century, Italy went through a great deal of socio-economic changes, several foreign invasions and the turbulent Risorgimento, which resulted in Italian unification in 1861. Thus, Italian art went through a series of minor and major changes in style.

Italian Neoclassicism was the earliest manifestation of the general period known as Neoclassicism and lasted more than the other national variants of neoclassicism. It developed in opposition to the Baroque style around c. 1750 and lasted until c. 1850. Neoclassicism began around the period of the rediscovery of Pompeii and spread all over Europe as a generation of art students returned to their countries from the Grand Tour in Italy with rediscovered Greco-Roman ideals. It first centred in Rome where artists such as Antonio Canova and Jacques-Louis David were active in the second half of the 18th century, before moving to Paris. Painters of Vedute, like Canaletto and Giovanni Paolo Panini, also enjoyed a huge success during the Grand Tour. Neoclassical architecture was inspired by the Renaissance works of Andrea Palladio and saw in Luigi Vanvitelli the main interpreters of the style.

Classicist literature had a great impact on the Risorgimento movement: the main figures of the period include Vittorio Alfieri, Giuseppe Parini, Vincenzo Monti and Ugo Foscolo, Giacomo Leopardi and Alessandro Manzoni (nephew of Cesare Beccaria), who were also influenced by the French Enlightenment and German Romanticism. The virtuoso violinist Paganini and the operas of Rossini, Donnizetti, Bellini and, later, Verdi dominated the scene in Italian classical and romantic music.

The art of Francesco Hayez and especially that of the Macchiaioli represented a break with the classical school, which came to an end as Italy unified (see Italian modern and contemporary art). Neoclassicism was the last Italian-born style, after the Renaissance and Baroque, to spread to all Western Art.

=== Romania ===
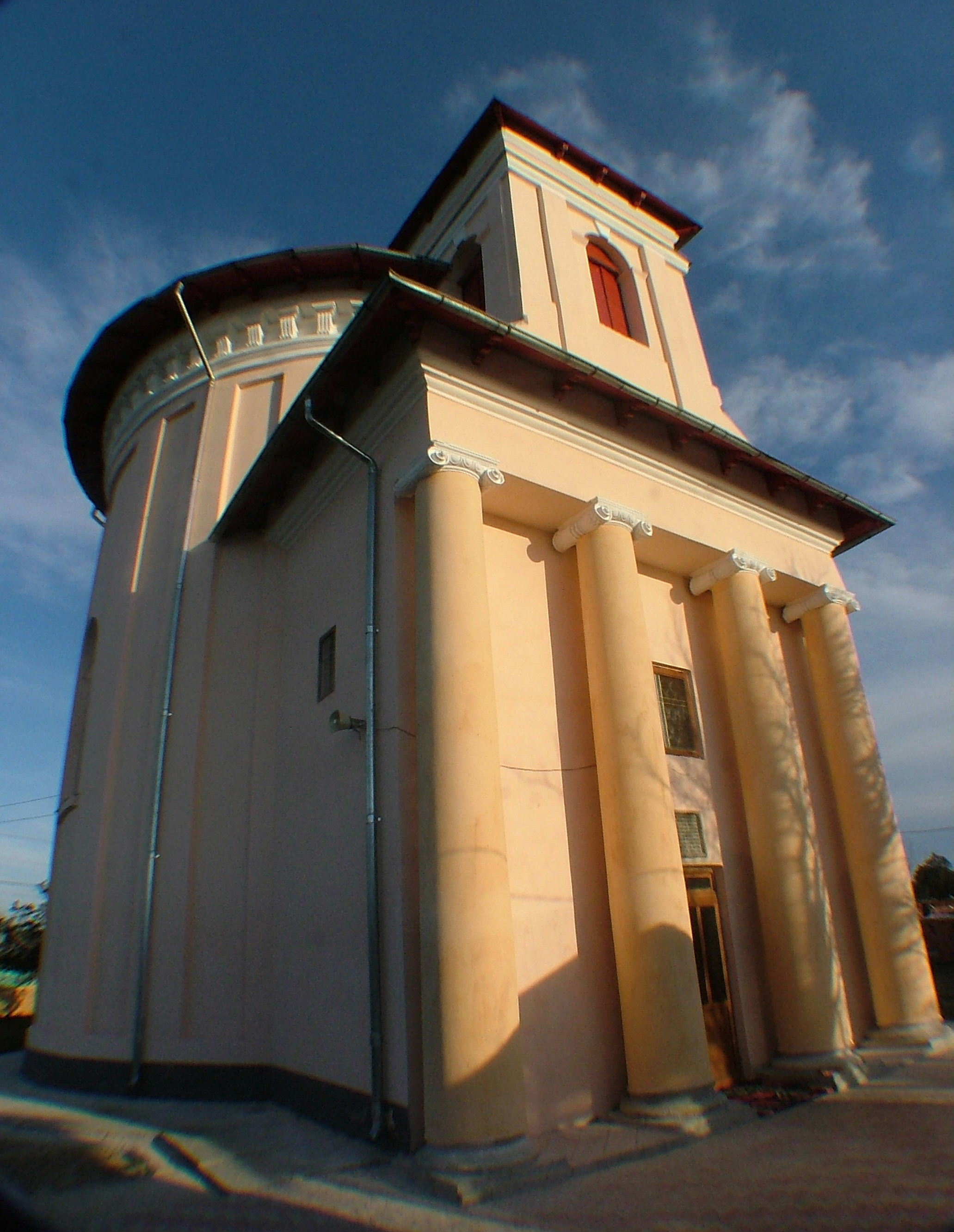
Round church of Saint Demetrius, Lețcani, unknown architect, 1795

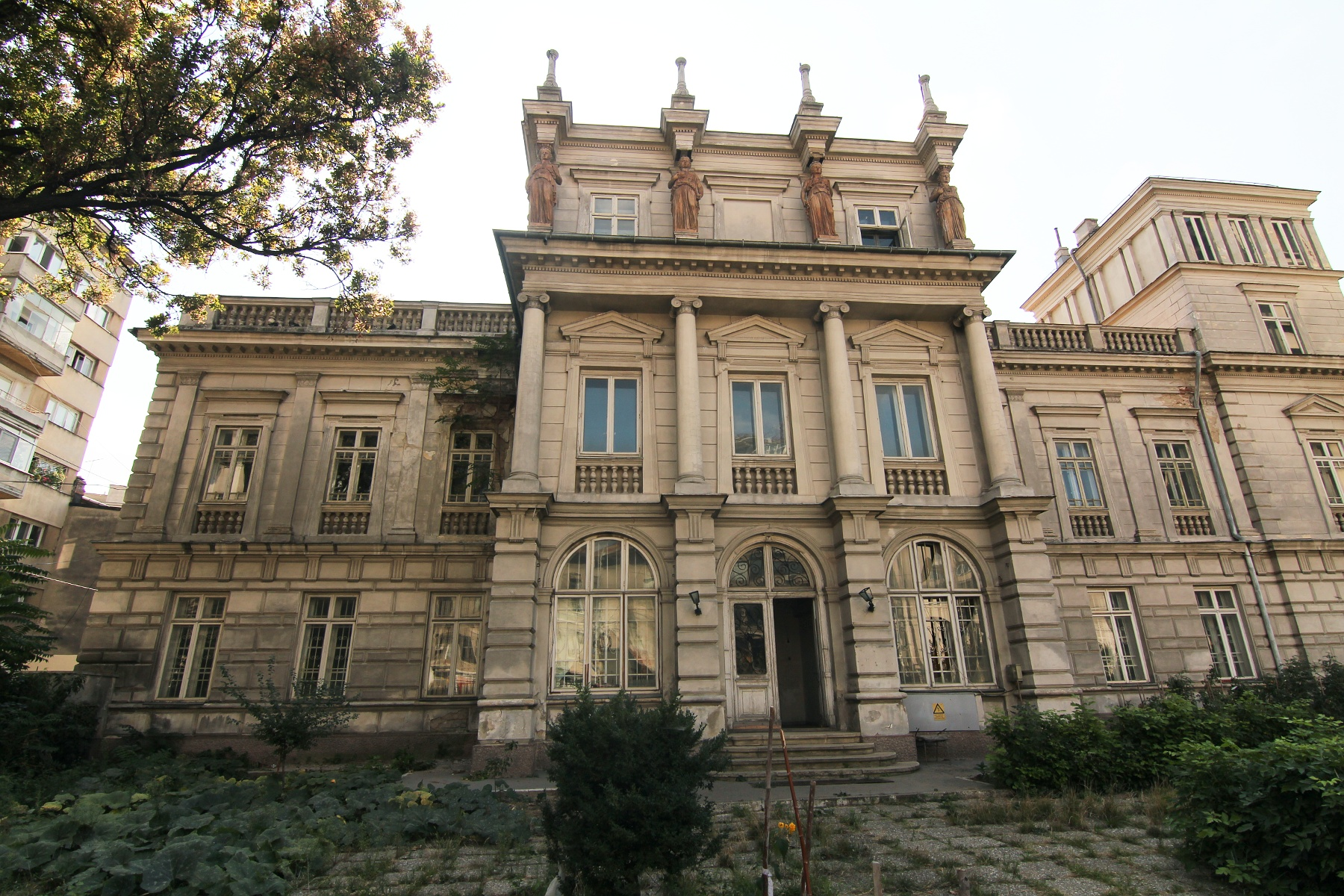
Știrbei Palace (Calea Victoriei no. 107), Bucharest, by Michel Sanjouand, c.1835; with a new level with caryatids added in 1882 by Joseph Hartmann

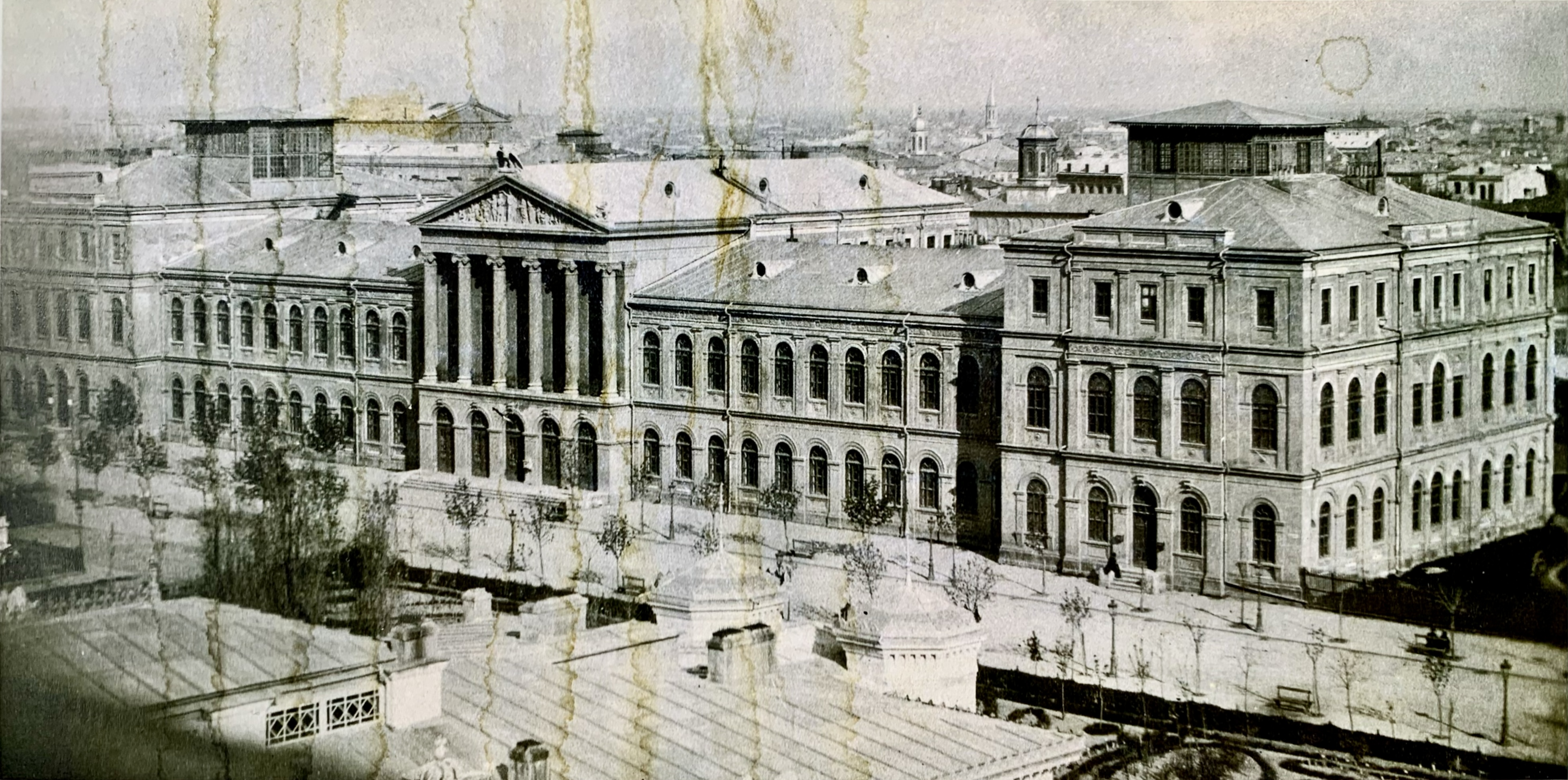
The old building of the University of Bucharest, designed by Alexandru Orăscu and decorated with sculptures by Karl Storck, 1857–1864, bombarded in April or May 1944 during WW2 and partially destroyed, partially rebuilt during the late 1960s

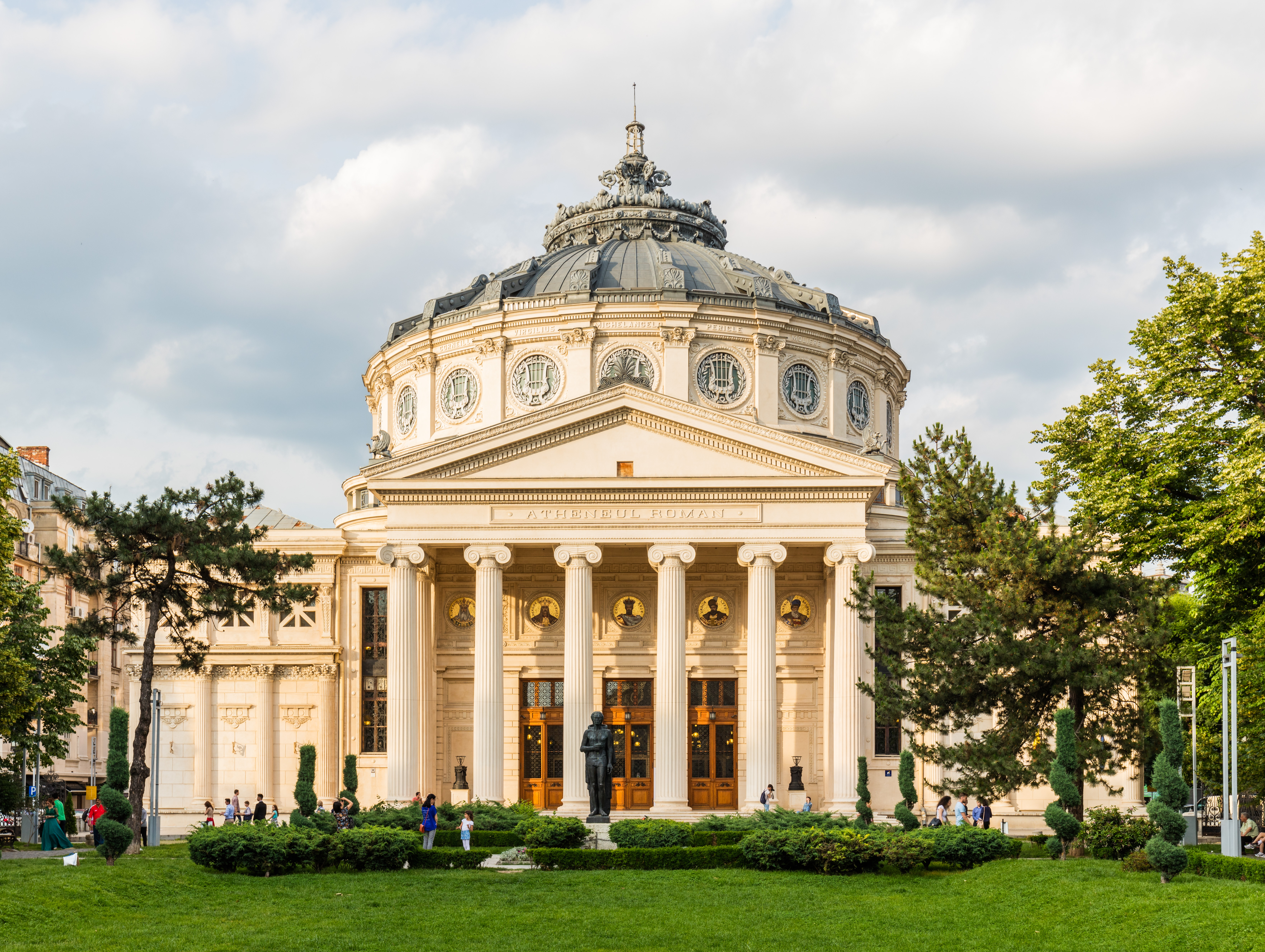
Romanian Athenaeum on Calea Victoriei, Bucharest, by Albert Galleron, 1886–1895

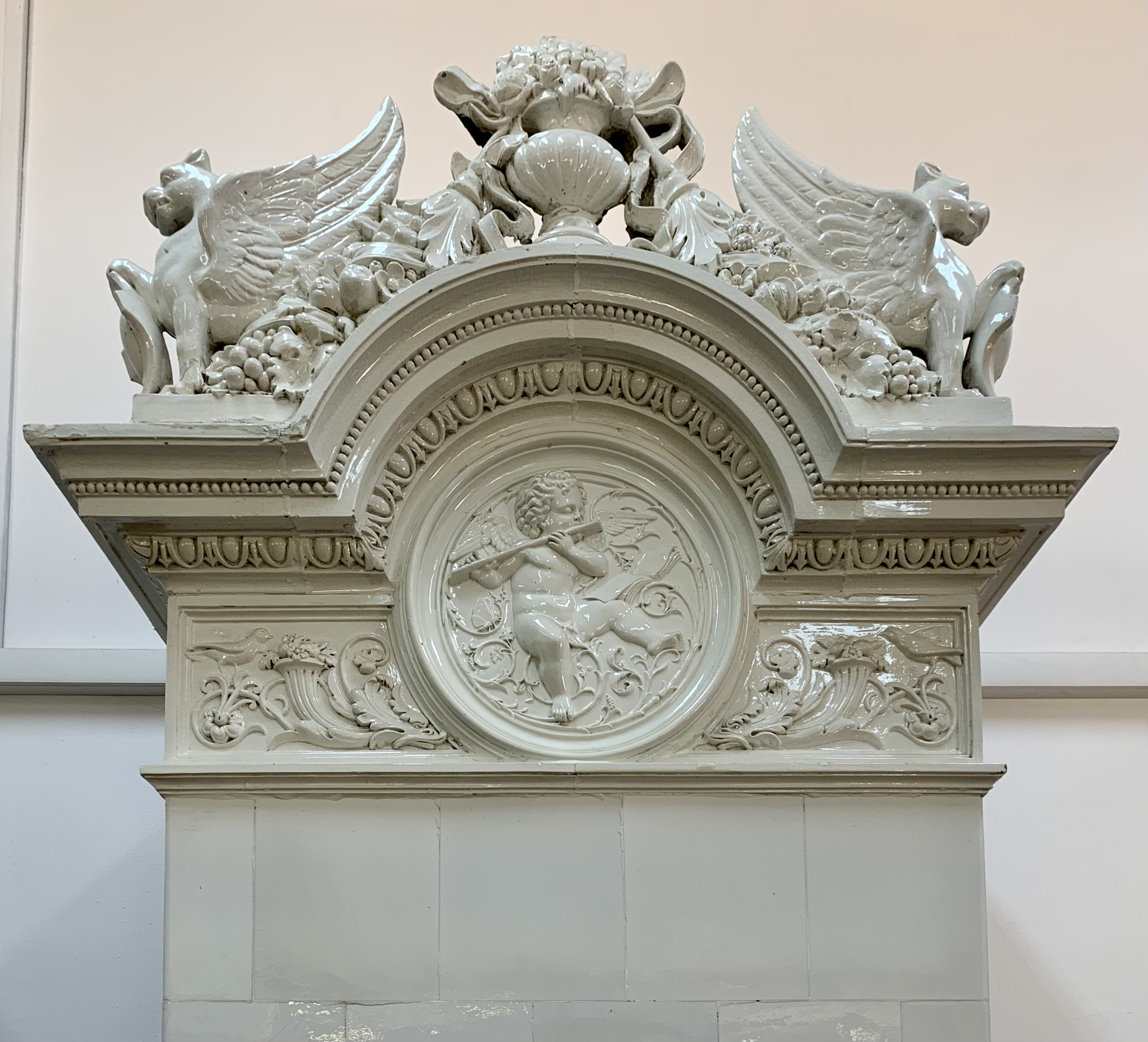
Upper part of a tiled stove in the principals' house of the Central Girls' School, Bucharest, unknown designer, 1890

During the 19th century, the predominant style in Wallachia and Moldavia, later the Kingdom of Romania, was Classicism which lasted for a long time, until the 20th century, although it coexisted in some short periods with other styles. Foreign architects and engineers were invited here since the first decade of the 19th century. Most of the architects that built during the beginning of the century were foreigners because Romanians did not have yet the instruction needed for designing buildings that were very different compared to the Romanian tradition. Usually using Classicism, they started building together with Romanian artisans, usually prepared in foreign schools or academies. Romanian architects studied in Western European schools as well. One example is Alexandru Orăscu, one of the representatives of Neoclassicism in Romania.

Classicism manifested both in religious and secular architecture. A good example of secular architecture is the Știrbei Palace on Calea Victoriei (Bucharest), built around the year 1835, after the plans of French architect Michel Sanjouand. It received a new level in 1882, designed by Austrian architect Joseph Hartmann

=== Ukraine ===
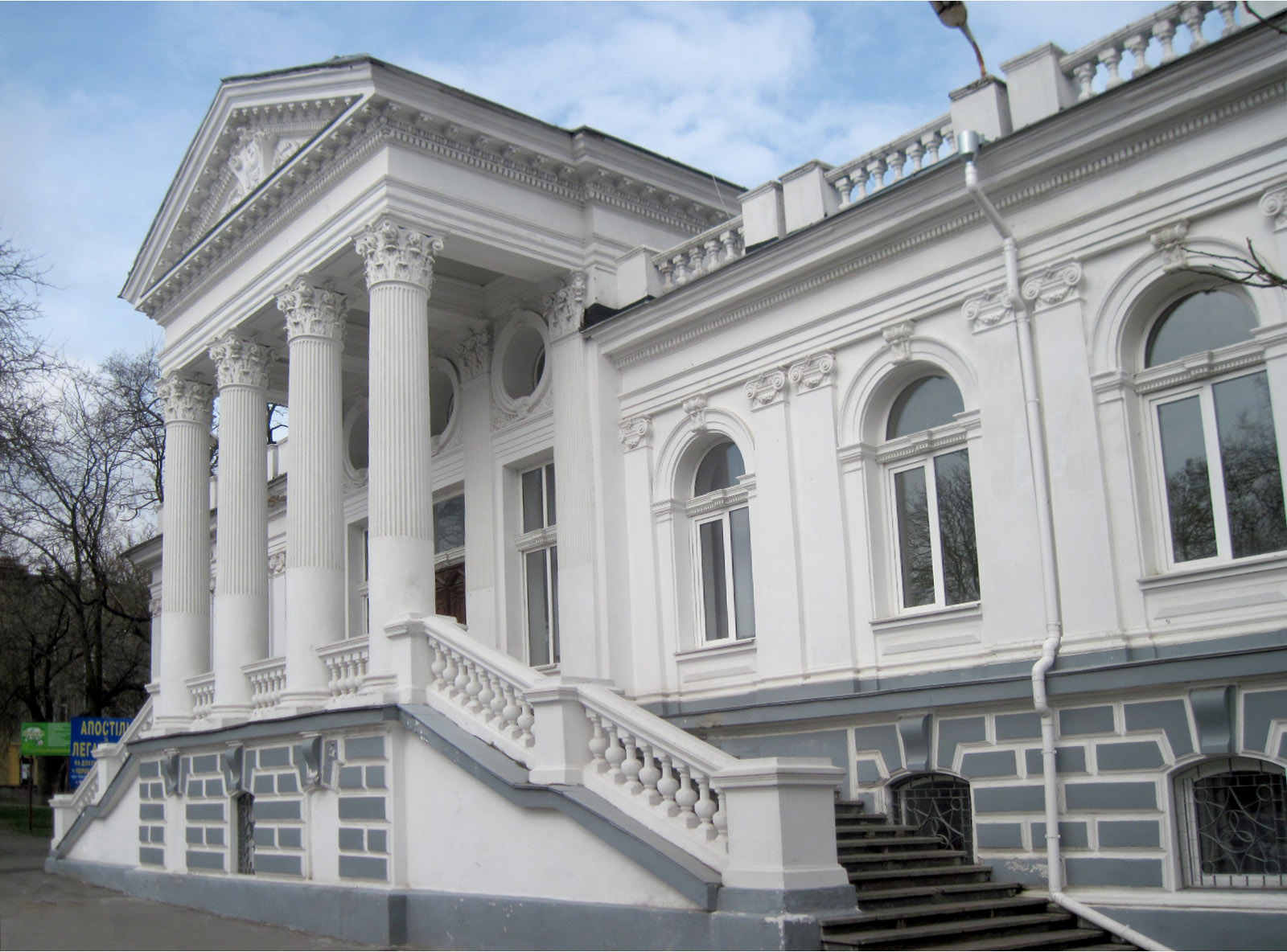
Building of the former library, Kherson

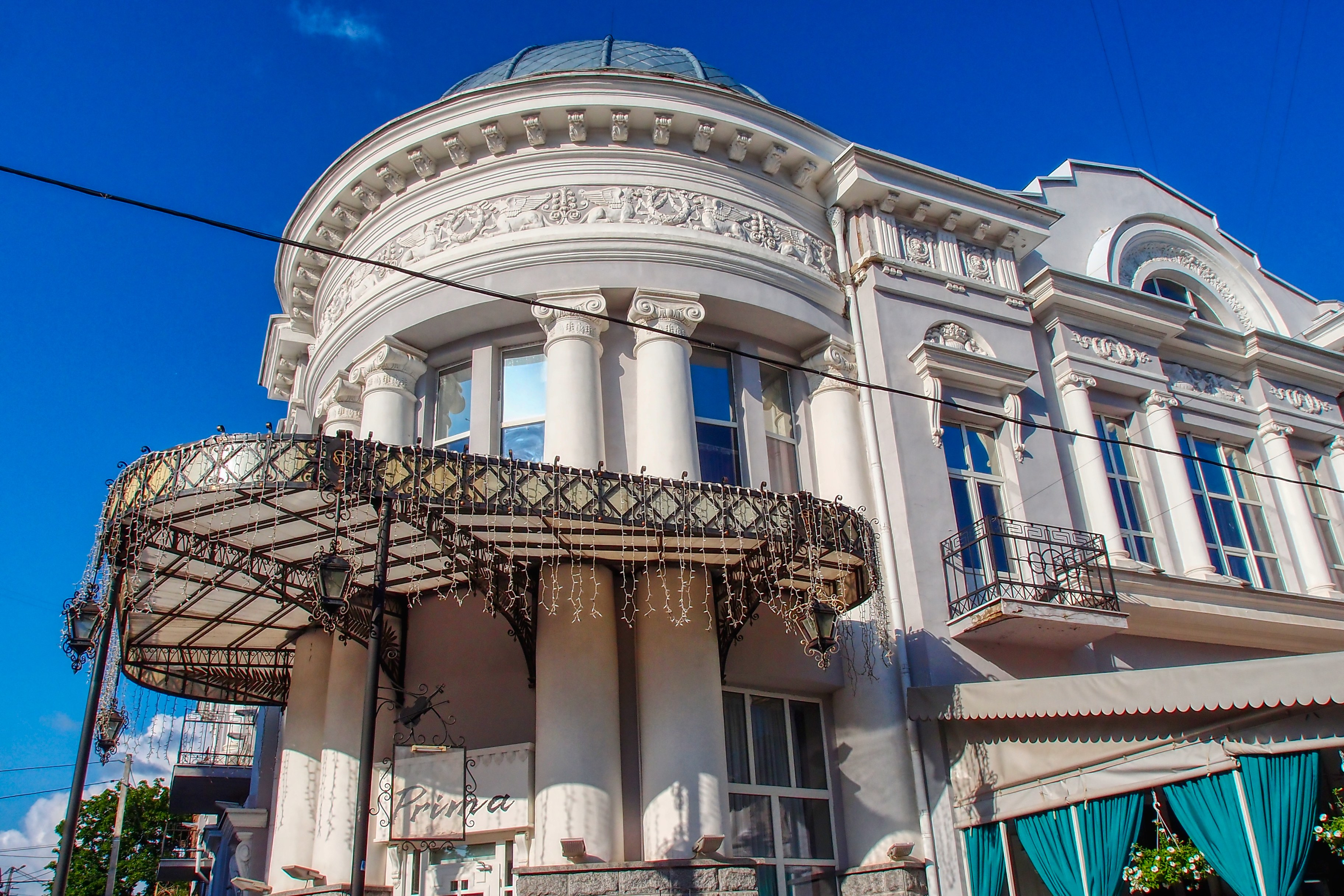
Resttant "Prima", Kropyvnytskyi

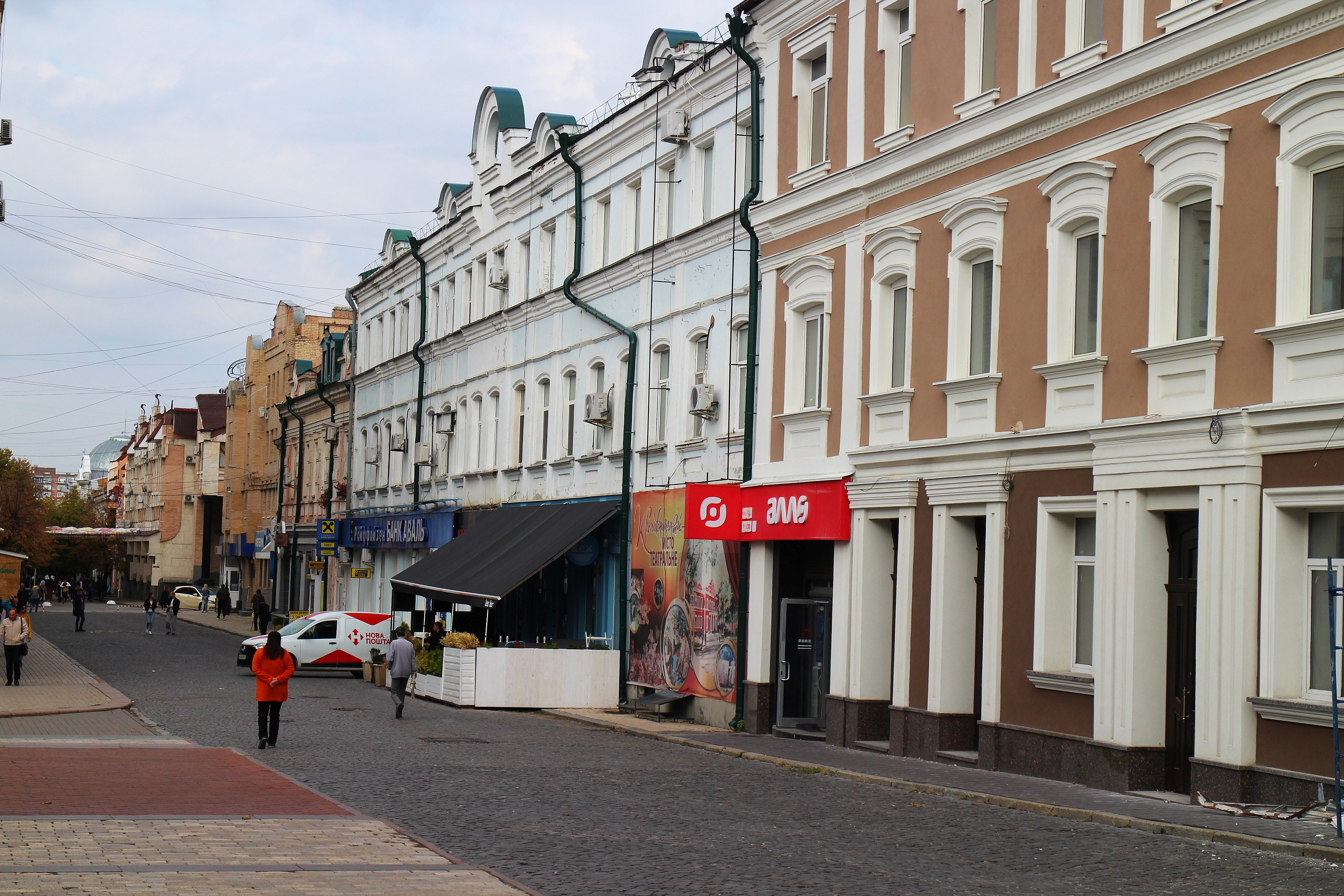
Teatral'na street (earlier Dvortsova) Kropyvnytskyi

In some Ukrainian cities, the rich architectural heritage of the times of the Russian and Austro-Hungarian empires has been preserved, reflecting the fact that the Ukrainian ethnic lands for most of history were under control of other states. A vivid example is Teatralna street in the city of Kropyvnytskyi, all buildings of which were built in the 19th century in the neoclassical style by invited European architects.

=== Russia and the Soviet Union ===
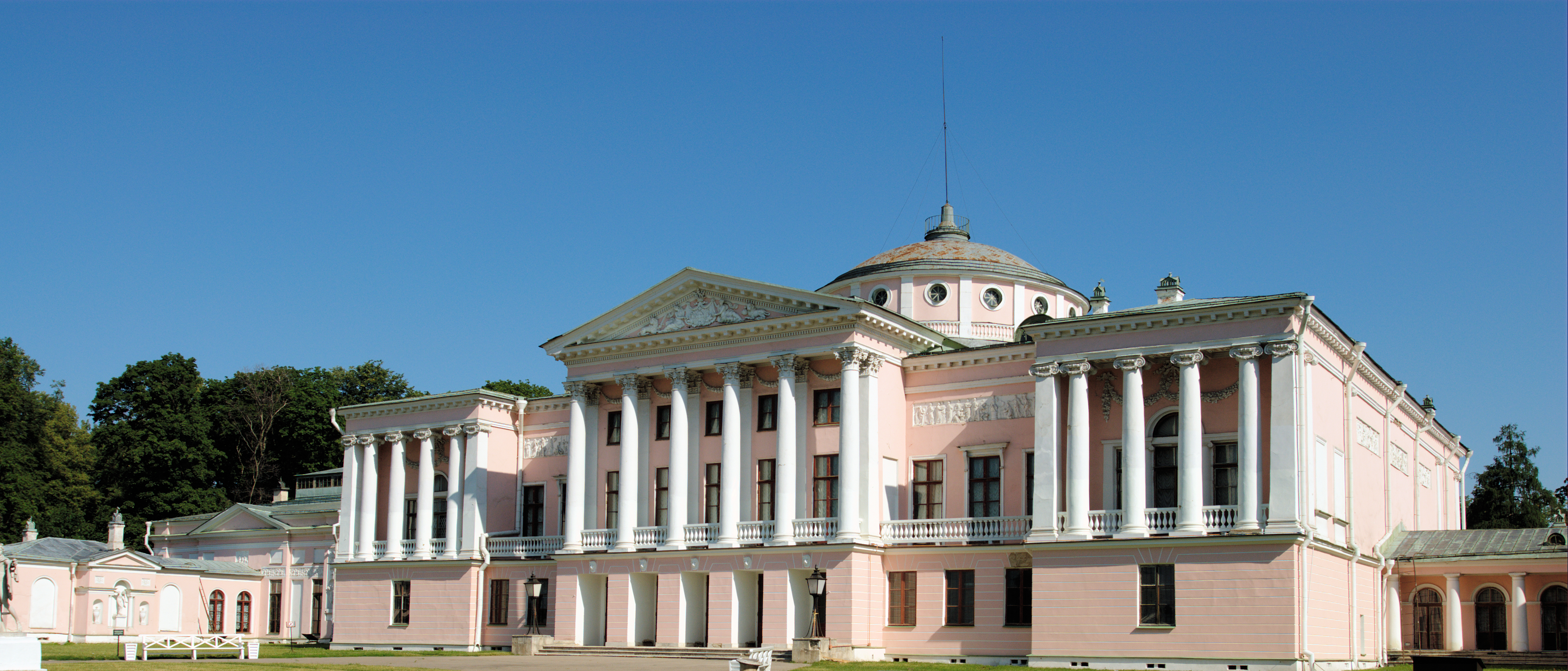
Ostankino Palace, Moscow, Russia, by Francesco Camporesi, completed in 1798

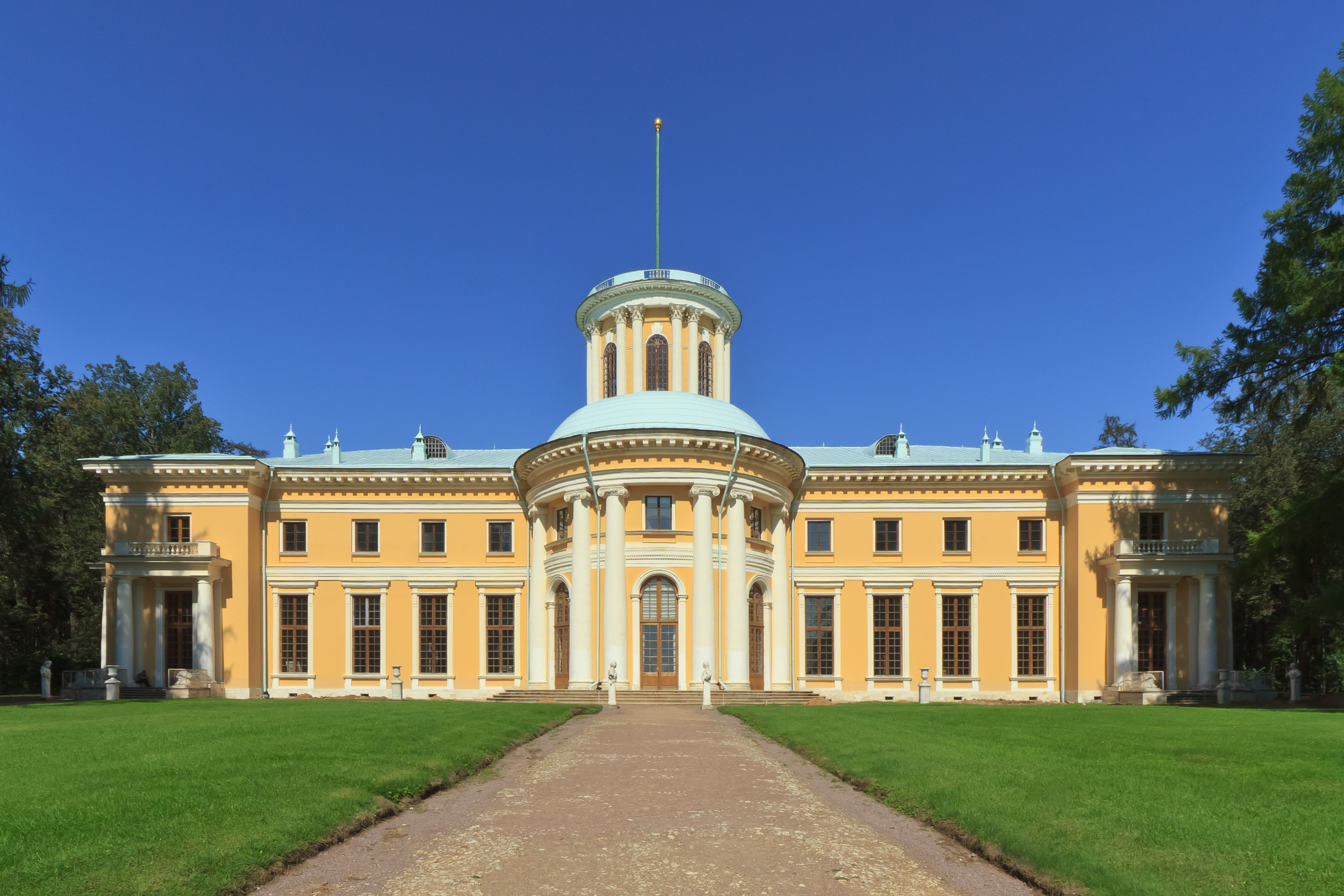
Arkhangelskoye Estate, Krasnogorsky District, Moscow Oblast, by Jacob Guerne, unknown date

In 1905–1914 Russian architecture passed through a brief but influential period of Neoclassical revival; the trend began with recreation of Empire style of Alexandrine period and quickly expanded into a variety of neo-Renaissance, Palladian and modernized, yet recognizably classical schools. They were led by architects born in the 1870s, who reached creative peak before World War I, like Ivan Fomin, Vladimir Shchuko and Ivan Zholtovsky. When the economy recovered in the 1920s, these architects and their followers continued working in primarily modernist environment; some (Zholtovsky) strictly followed the classical canon, others (Fomin, Schuko, Ilya Golosov) developed their own modernized styles.

With the crackdown on architect's independence and official denial of modernism (1932), demonstrated by the international contest for the Palace of Soviets, Neoclassicism was instantly promoted as one of the choices in Stalinist architecture, although not the only choice. It coexisted with moderately modernist architecture of Boris Iofan, bordering with contemporary Art Deco (Schuko); again, the purest examples of the style were produced by Zholtovsky school that remained an isolated phenomena. The political intervention was a disaster for constructivist leaders yet was sincerely welcomed by architects of the classical schools.

Neoclassicism was an easy choice for the Soviet Union since it did not rely on modern construction technologies (steel frame or reinforced concrete) and could be reproduced in traditional masonry. Thus the designs of Zholtovsky, Fomin and other old masters were easily replicated in remote towns under strict material rationing. Improvement of construction technology after World War II permitted Stalinist architects to venture into skyscraper construction, although stylistically these skyscrapers (including "exported" architecture of Palace of Culture and Science, Warsaw and the Shanghai International Convention Centre) share little with the classical models. Neoclassicism and neo-Renaissance persisted in less demanding residential and office projects until 1955, when Nikita Khrushchev put an end to expensive Stalinist architecture.

=== United Kingdom ===
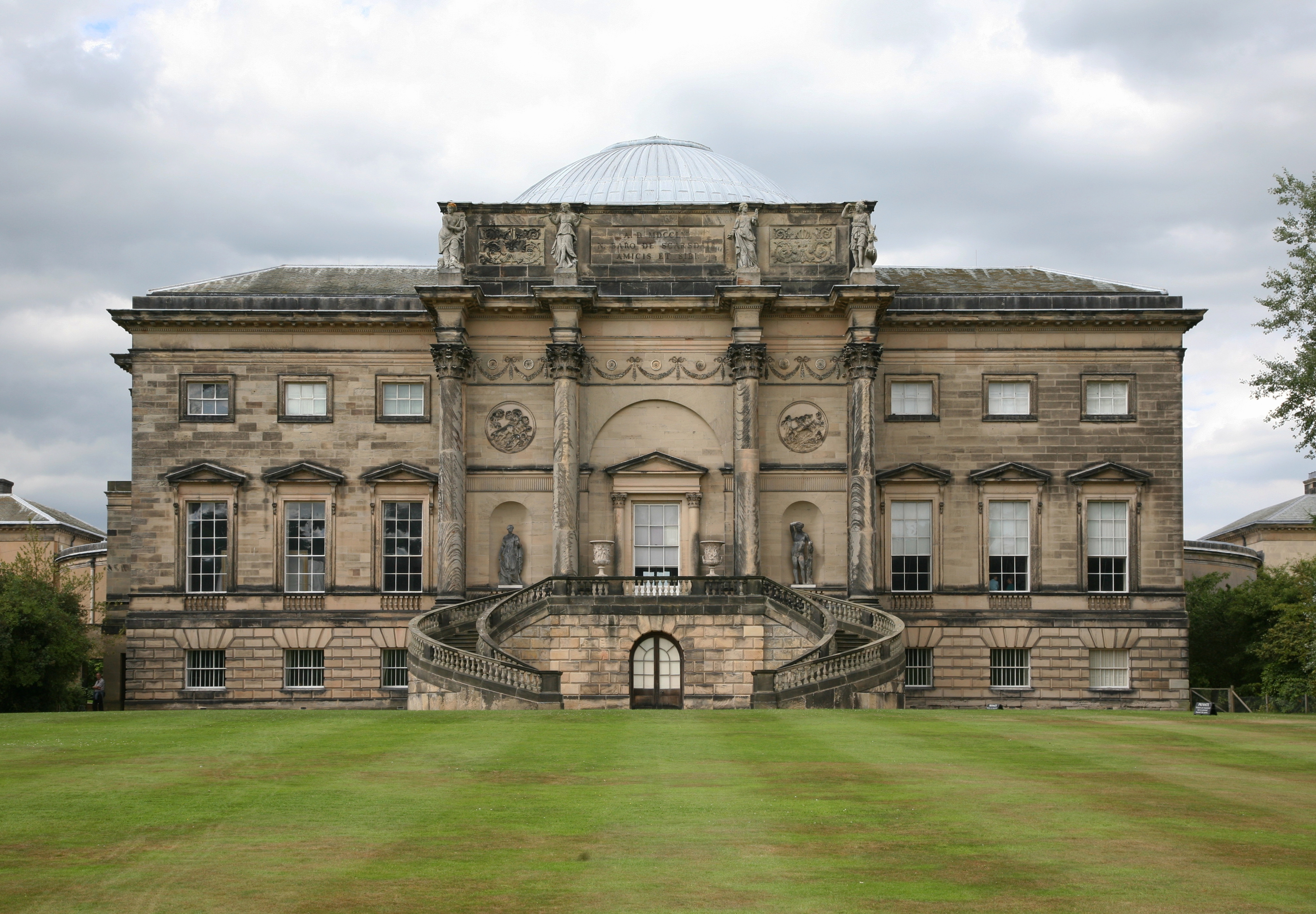
Kedleston Hall, Kedleston, Derbyshire, England, by Robert Adam, 1760–1770

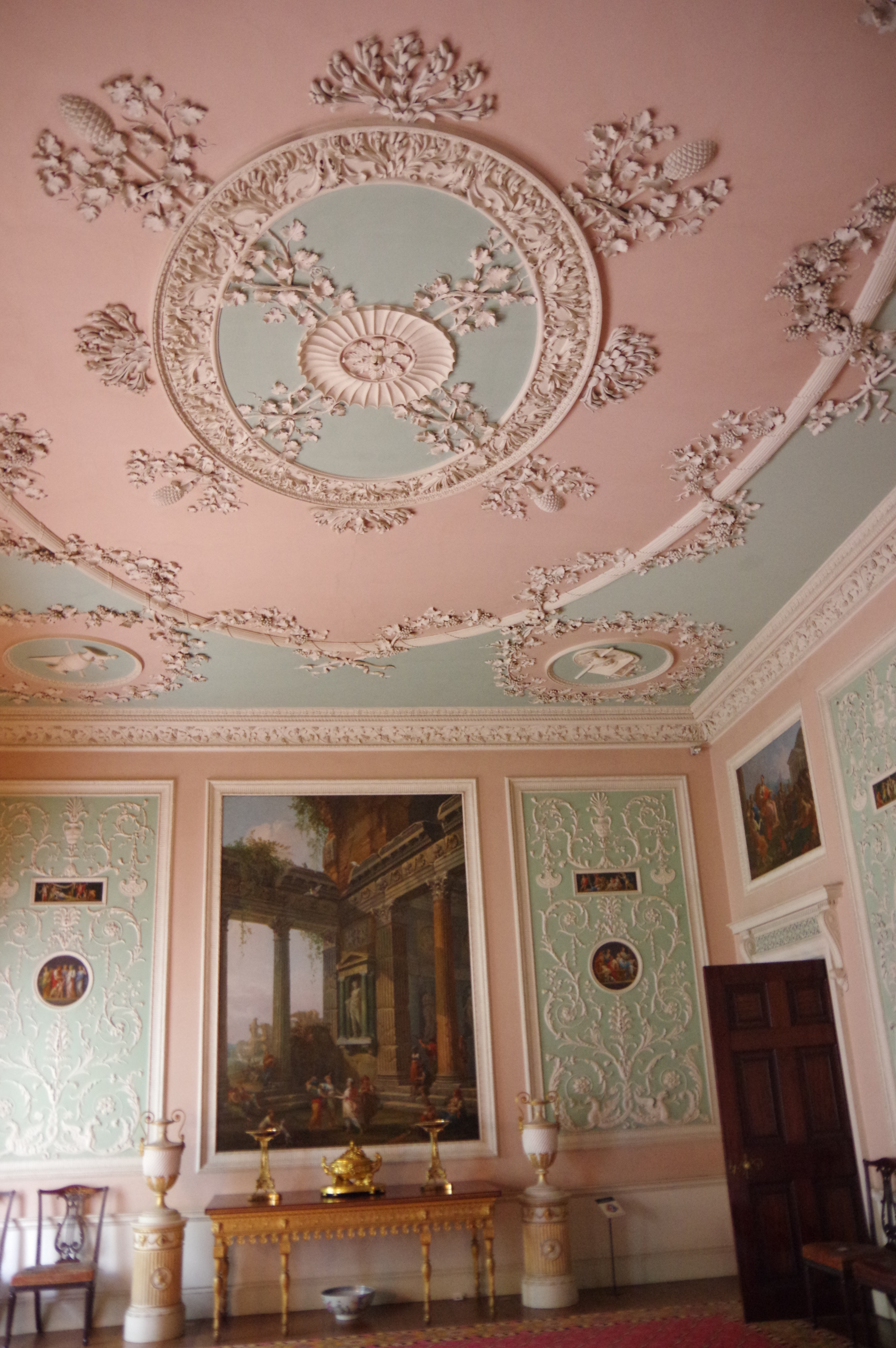
Eating Room, Osterley Park, London, by Robert Adam, 1761

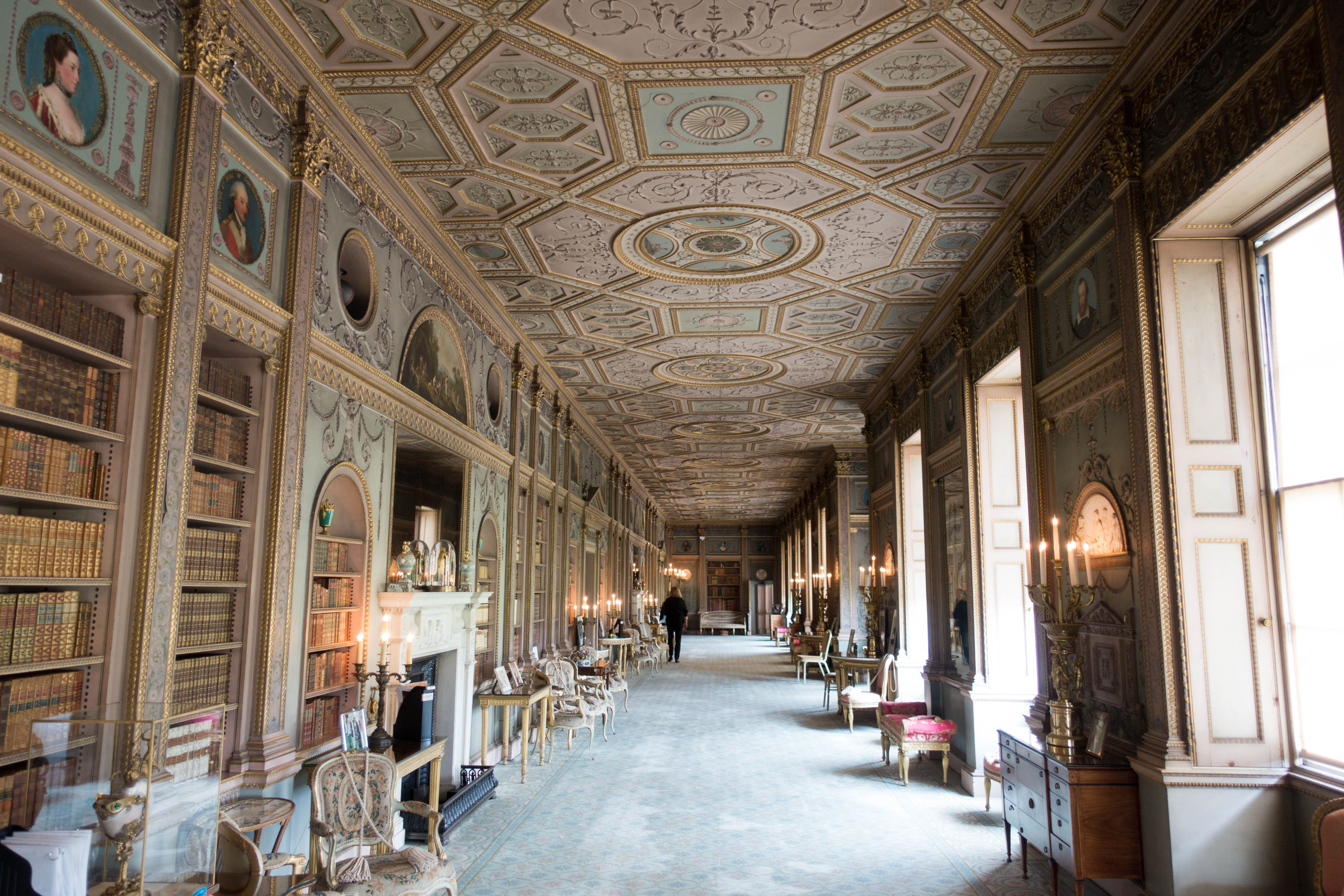
Syon House, Middlesex, England, by Robert Adam, 1762

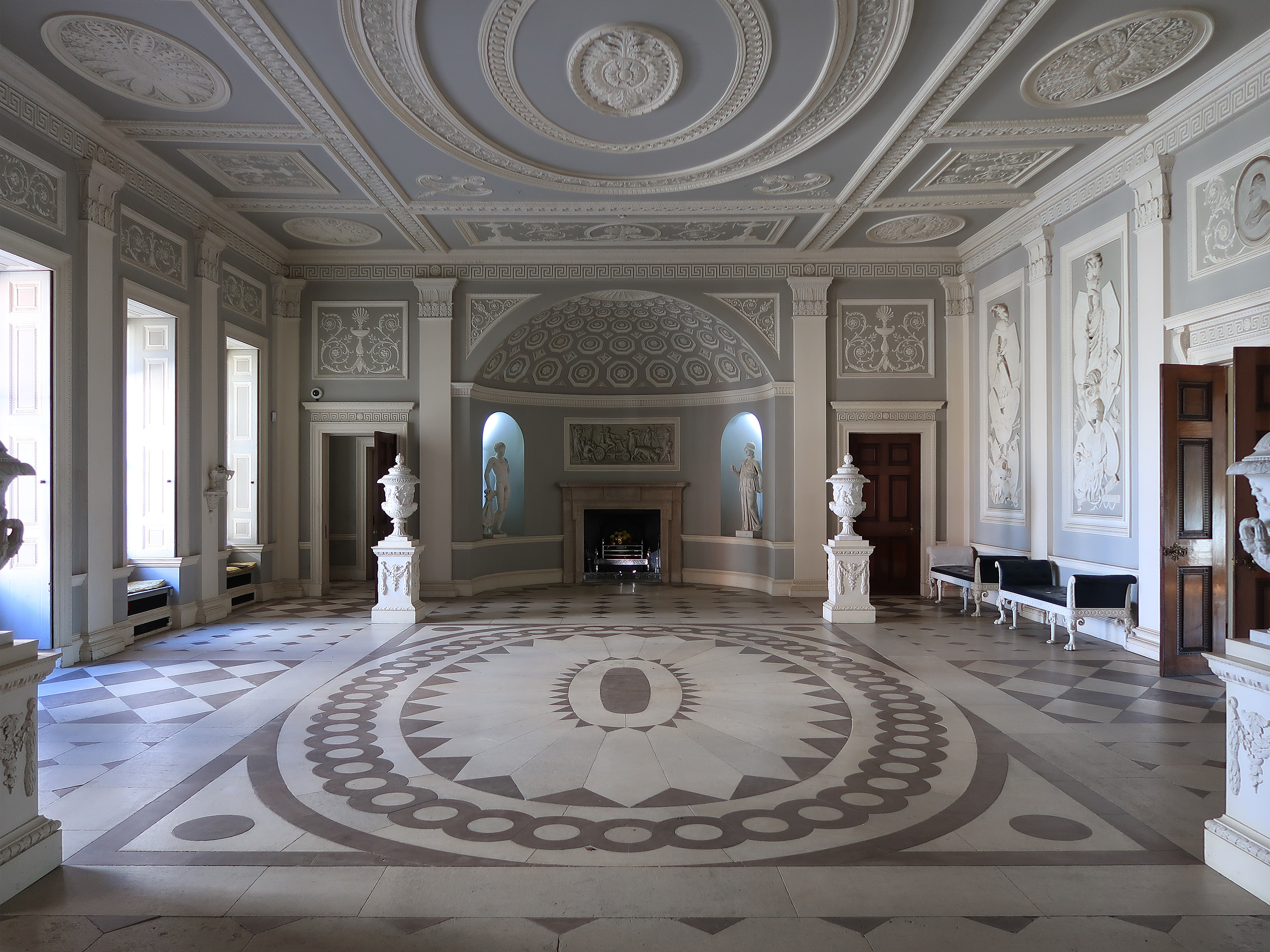
The Hall, Osterley Park, by Robert Adam, 1767

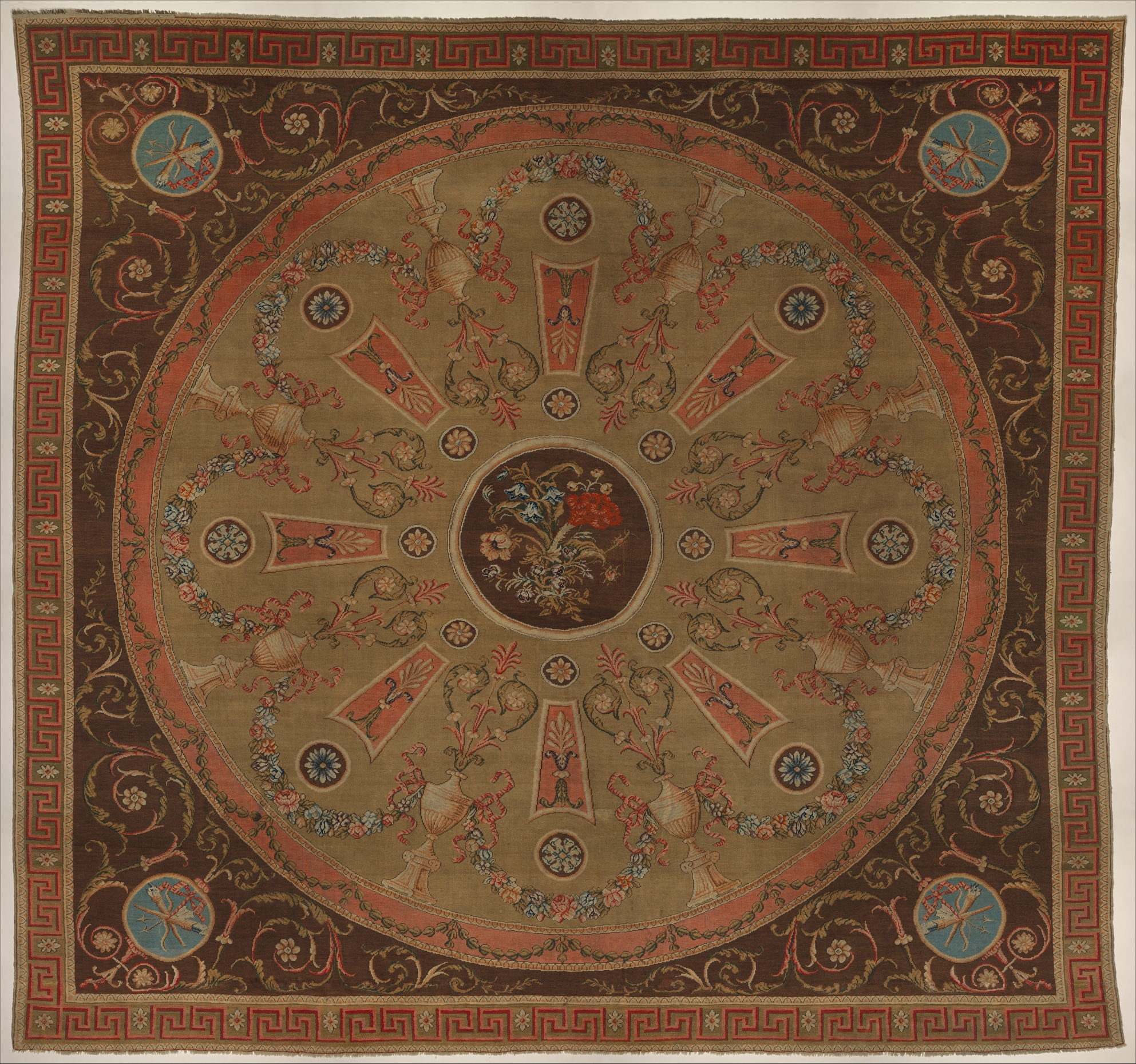
Carpet; by Robert Adam; 1770–1780; knotted wool; 505.5 x 473.1 cm; Metropolitan Museum of Art, New York City

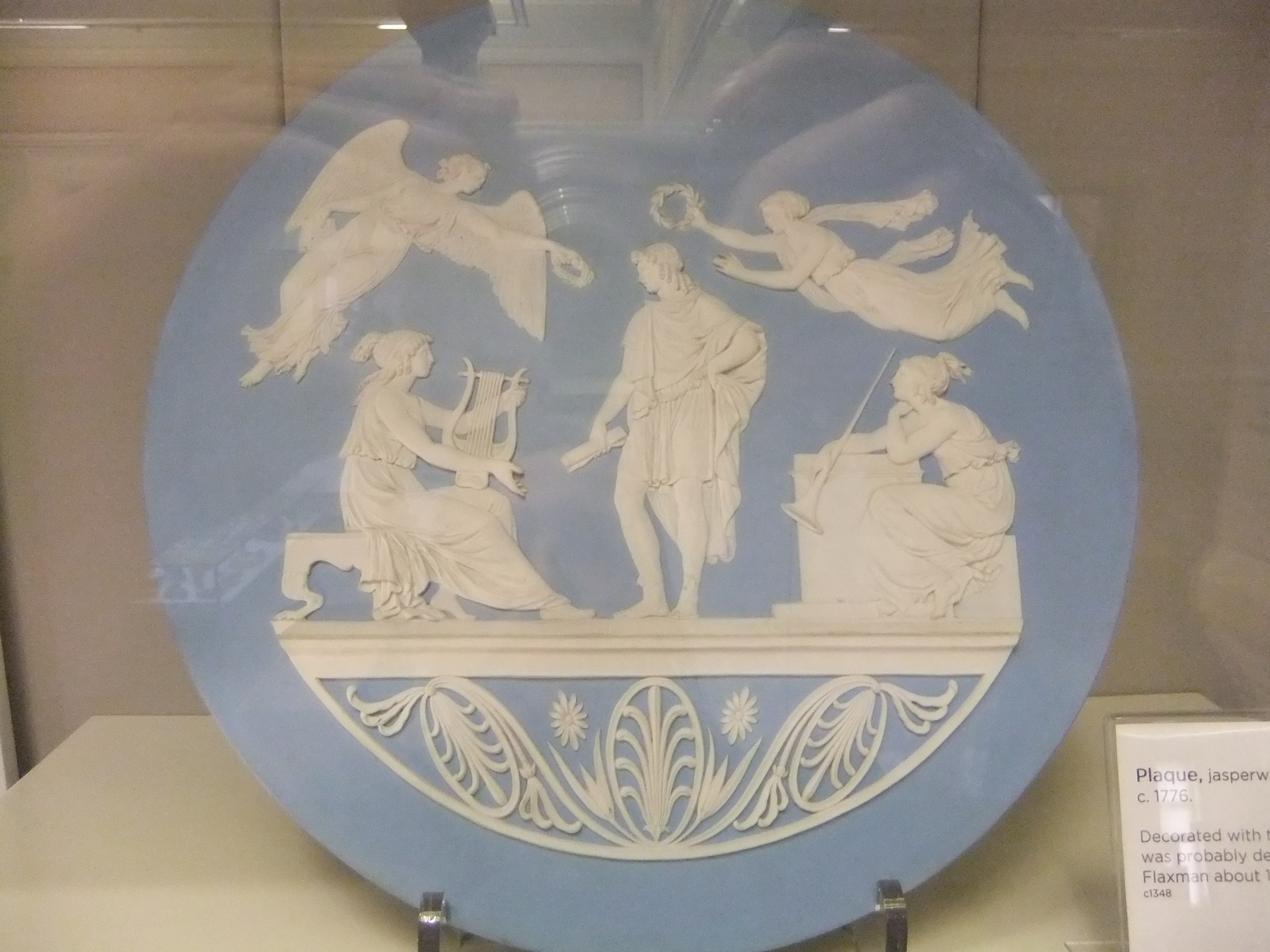
Apotheosis of Virgil; by John Flaxman; c.1776; jasperware; diameter: 41 cm; Harris Museum, Preston, Lancashire, UK

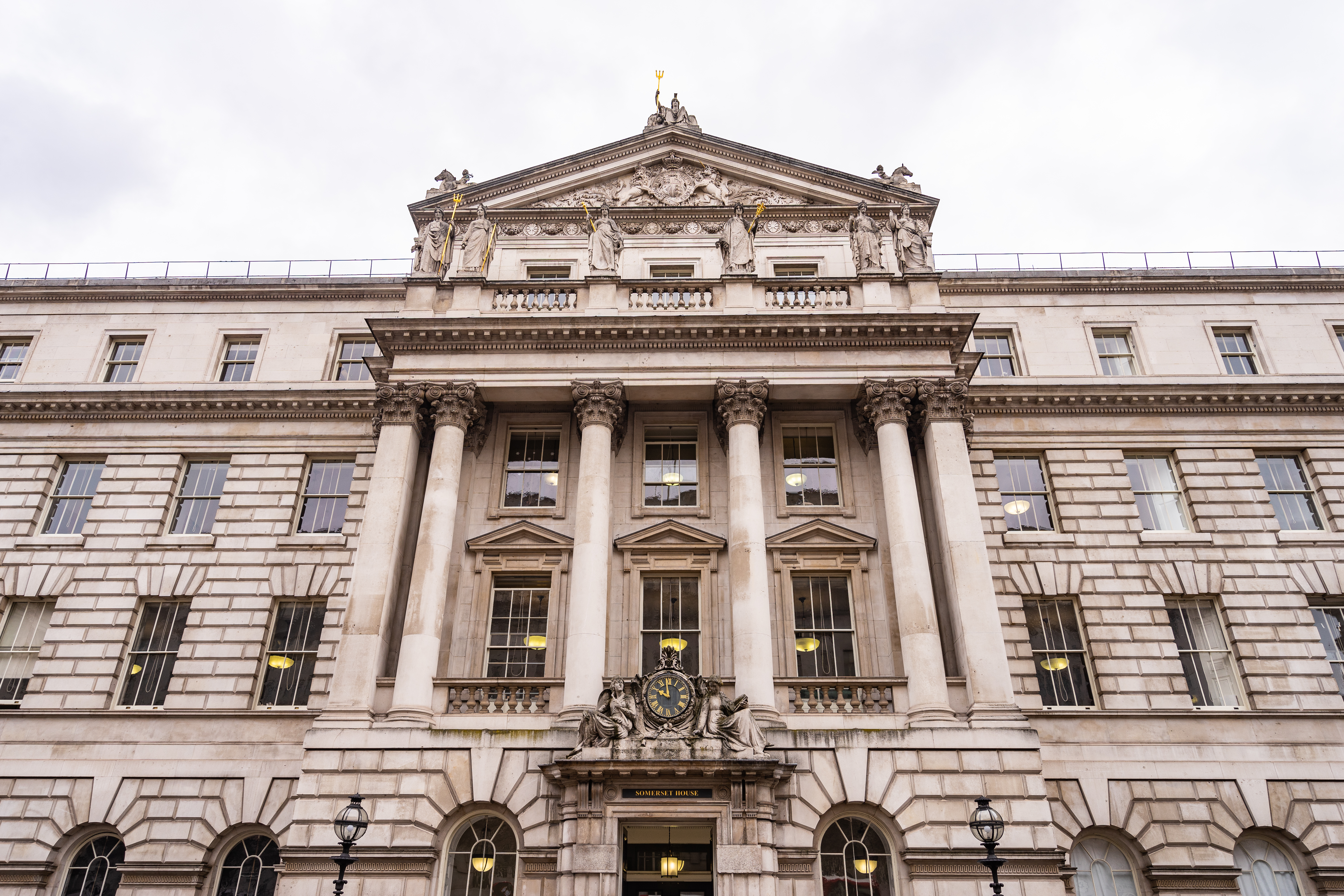
Somerset House, London, by William Chambers, 1776-1801

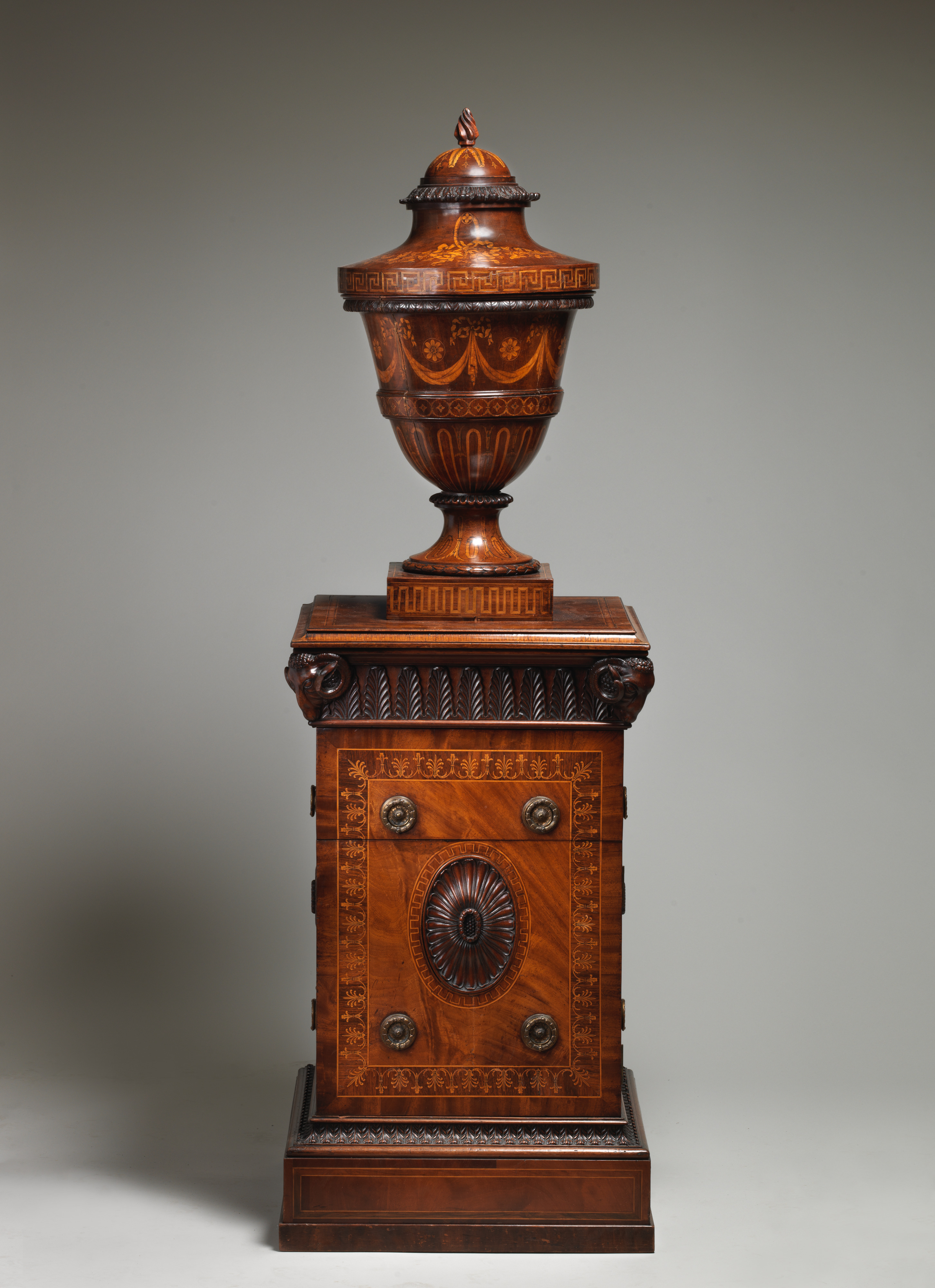
Urn on pedestal; c.1780 with latter additions; by Robert Adam; inlaid mahogany; height: 49.8 cm; Metropolitan Museum of Art

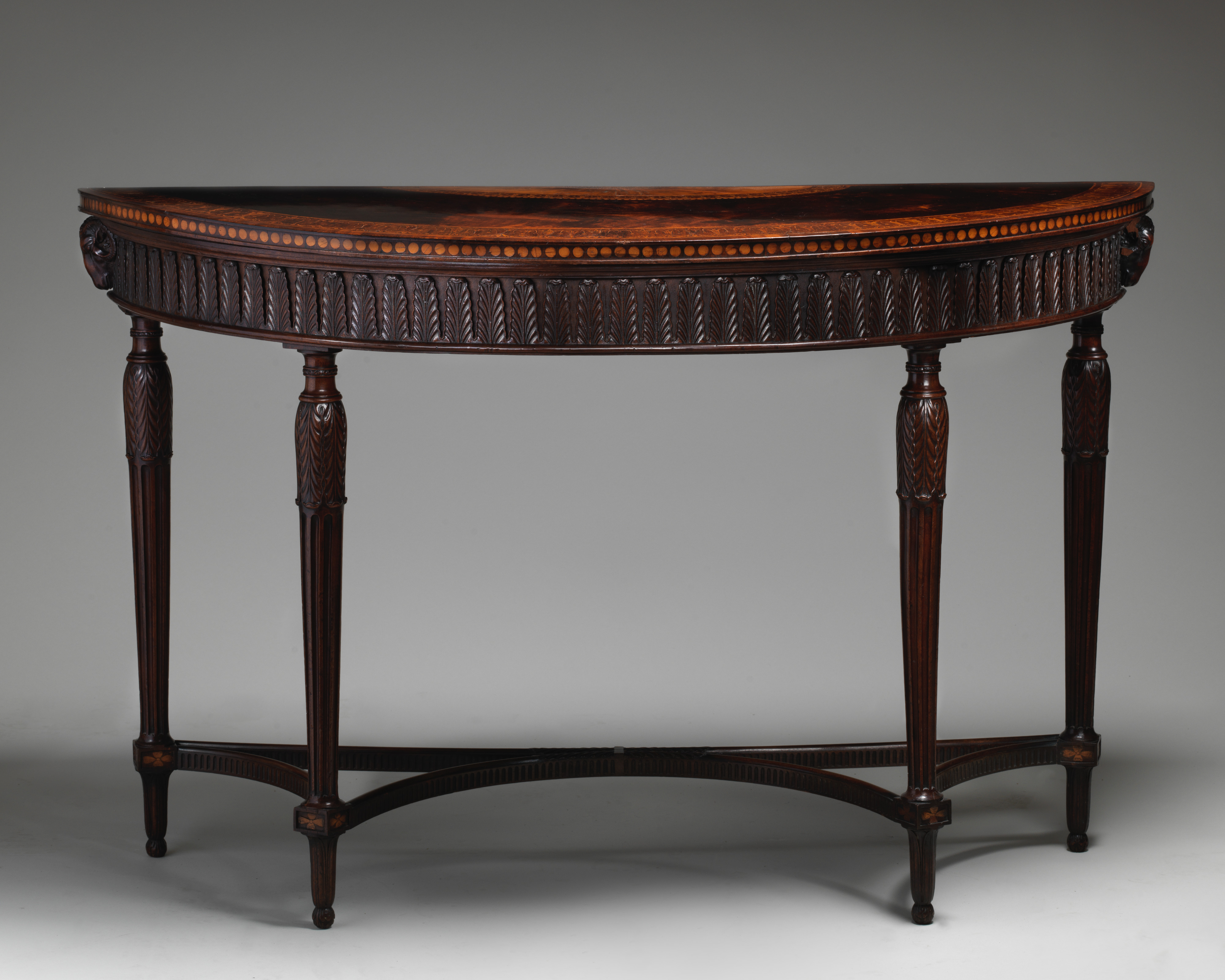
Side table with many acanthus leaves and two bucrania; by Robert Adam; c.1780 with later addition; mahogany; overall: 88.6 × 141.3 × 57.1 cm; Metropolitan Museum of Art

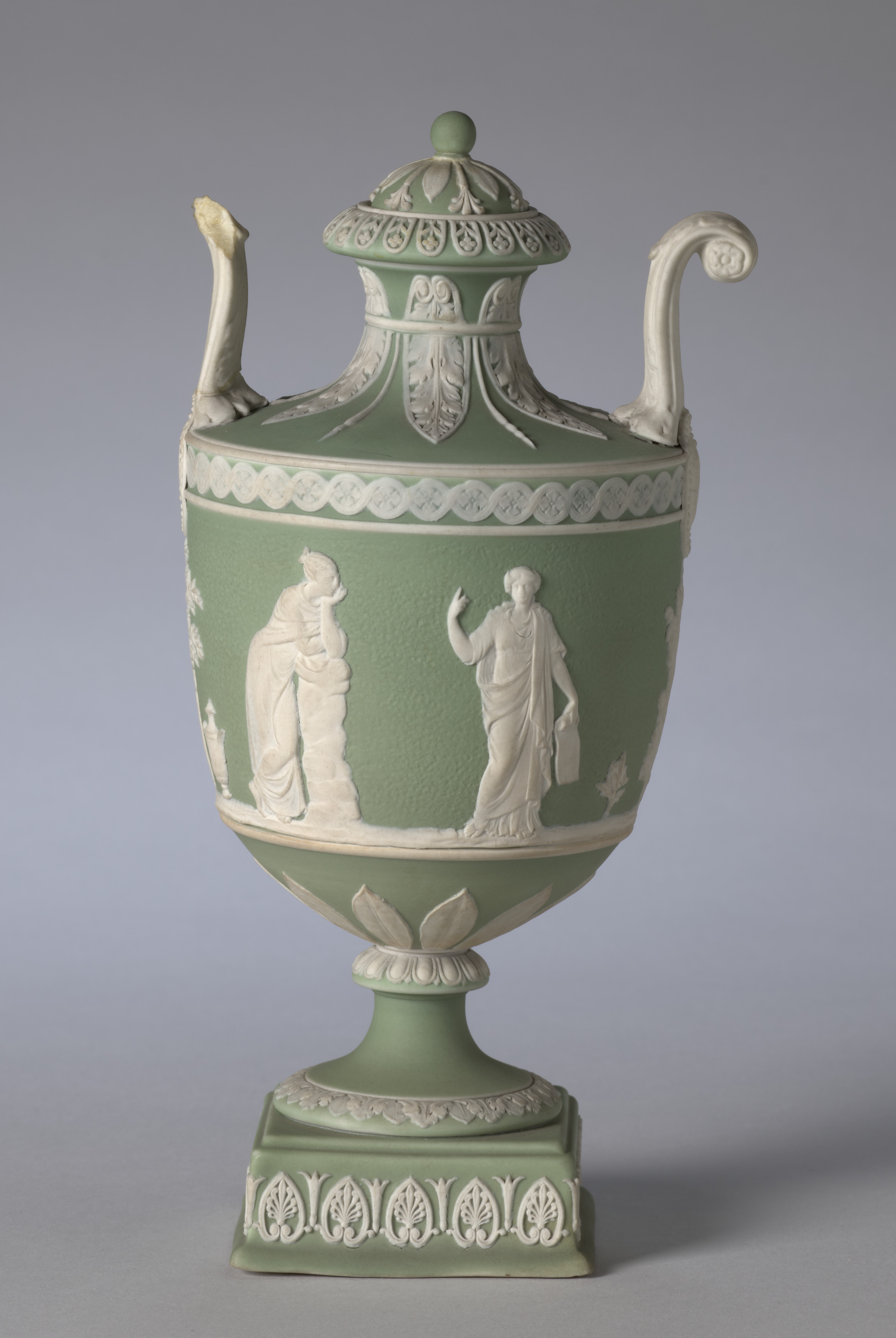
Covered Wedgwood urn; c.1800; jasper ware with relief decoration; overall: 19.7 cm; Cleveland Museum of Art, Cleveland, Ohio, US

The Adam style was created by two brothers, Adam and James, who published in 1777 a volume of etchings with interior ornamentation. In the interior decoration made after Robert Adam's drawings, the walls, ceilings, doors, and any other surface, are divided into big panels: rectangular, round, square, with stuccos and Greco-Roman motifs at the edges. Ornaments used include festoons, pearls, egg-and-dart bands, medallions, and any other motifs used during the Classical antiquity (especially the Etruscan ones). Decorative fittings such as urn-shaped stone vases, gilded silverware, lamps, and stauettes all have the same source of inspiration, classical antiquity. The Adam style emphasizes refined rectangular mirrors, framed like paintings (in frames with stylised leaves), or with a pediment above them, supporting an urn or a medallion. Another design of Adam mirrors is shaped like a Venetian window, with a big central mirror between two other thinner and longer ones. Another type of mirrors are the oval ones, usually decorated with festoons. The furniture in this style has a similar structure to Louis XVI furniture.

Besides the Adam style, when it comes to decorative arts, England is also known for the ceramic manufacturer Josiah Wedgwood (1730–1795), who established a pottery called Etruria. Wedgwood ware is made of a material called jasperware, a hard and fine-grained type of stoneware. Wedgwood vases are usually decorated with reliefs in two colours, in most cases the figures being white and the background blue.

=== United States ===
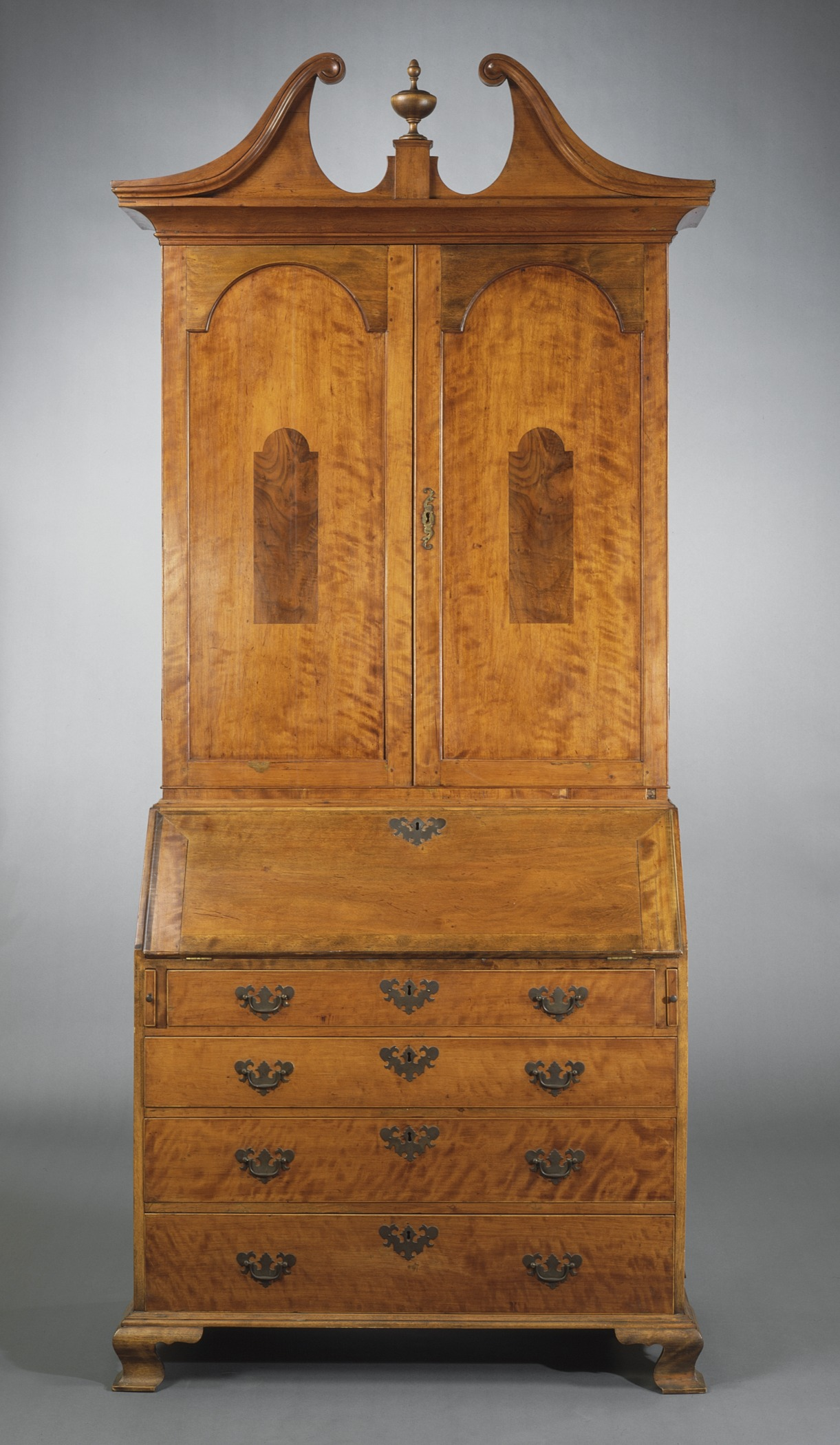
Maple secretary; c. 1790; maple and brass; height: 242.57 cm; Los Angeles County Museum of Art, US

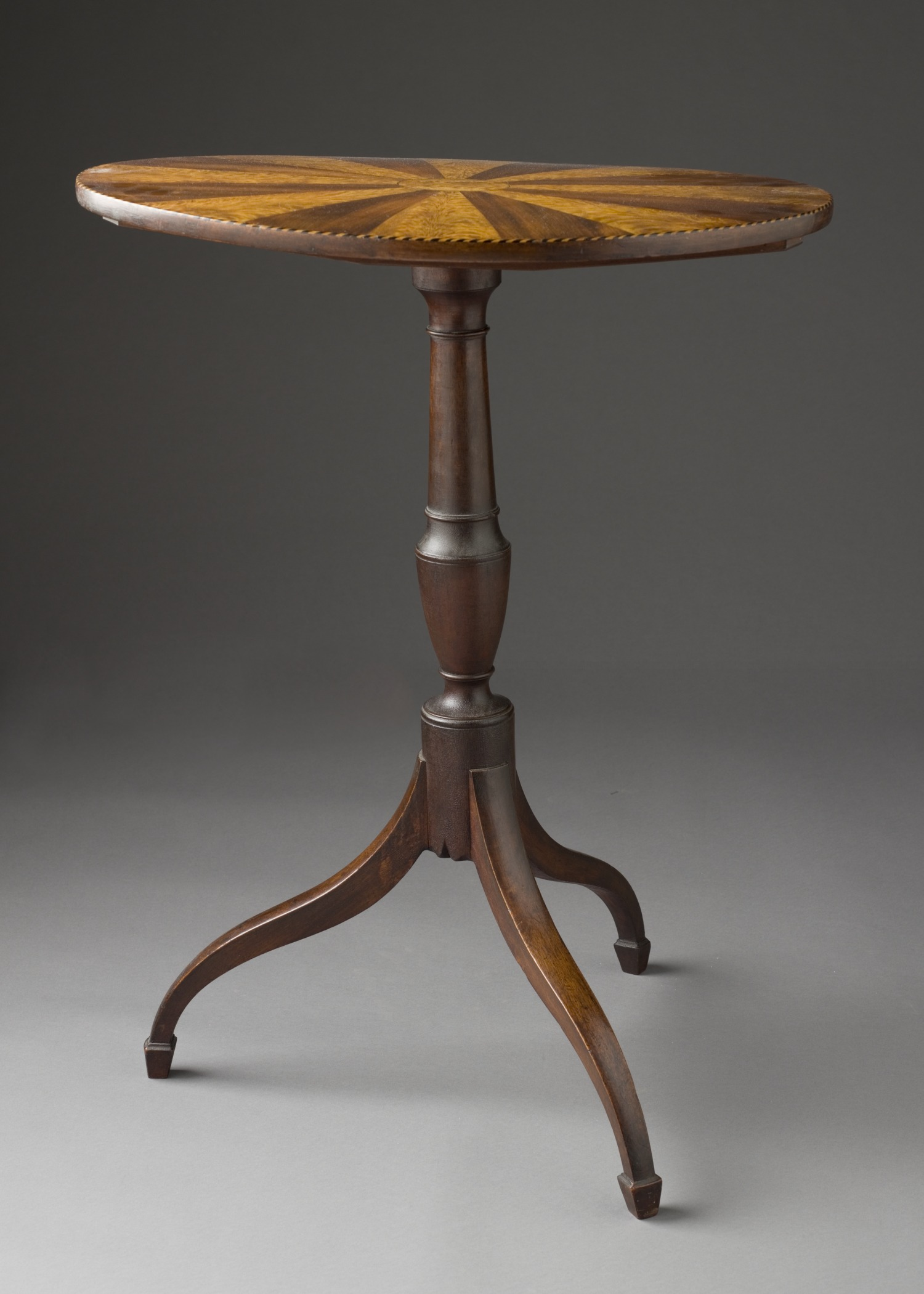
Candlestand; 1790–1800; mahogany, birch, and various inlays; 107 x 49.21 x 48.9 cm; Los Angeles County Museum of Art

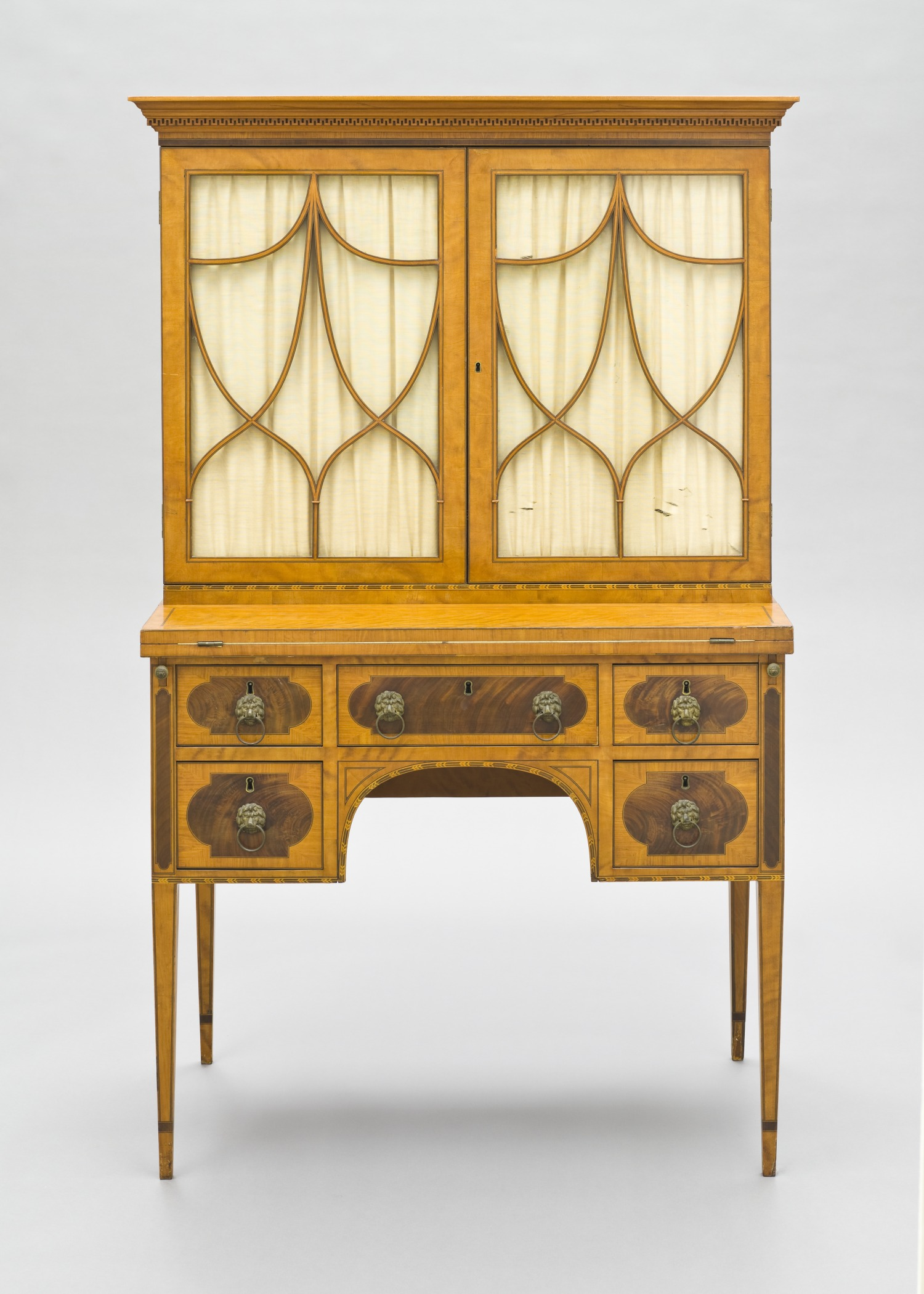
Writing desk; 1790–1810; satinwood, mahogany, tulip poplar, and pine; 153.67 x 90.17 x 51.44 cm; Los Angeles County Museum of Art

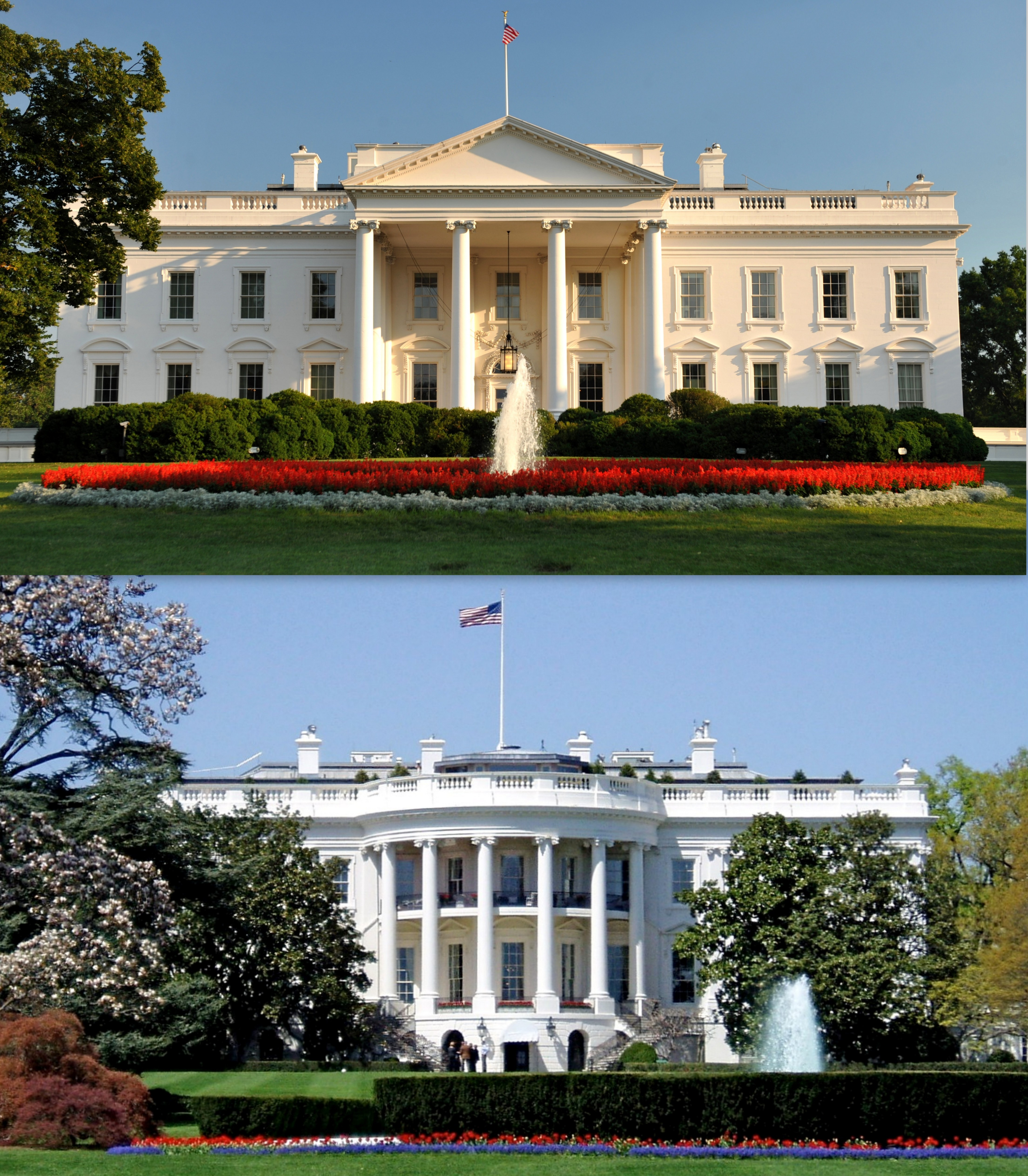
White House, Washington, D.C., by James Hoban, 1792-1829

Capitol Building, Washington, D.C., 1793–1863, by William Thornton and Thomas Ustick Walter

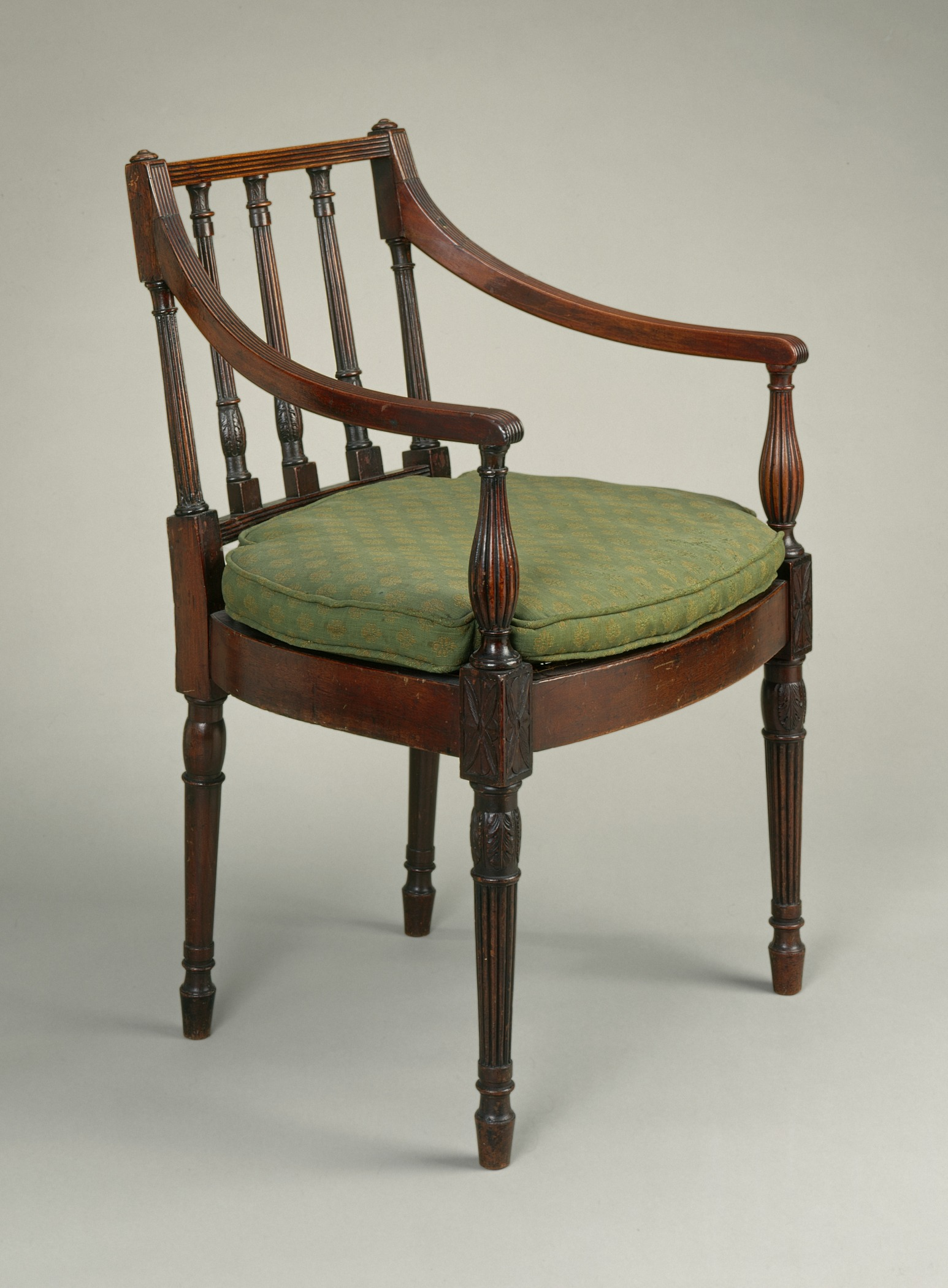
Armchair; possibly by Ephraim Haines; 1805–1815; mahogany and cane; height: 84.77 cm, width: 52.07 cm; Los Angeles County Museum of Art

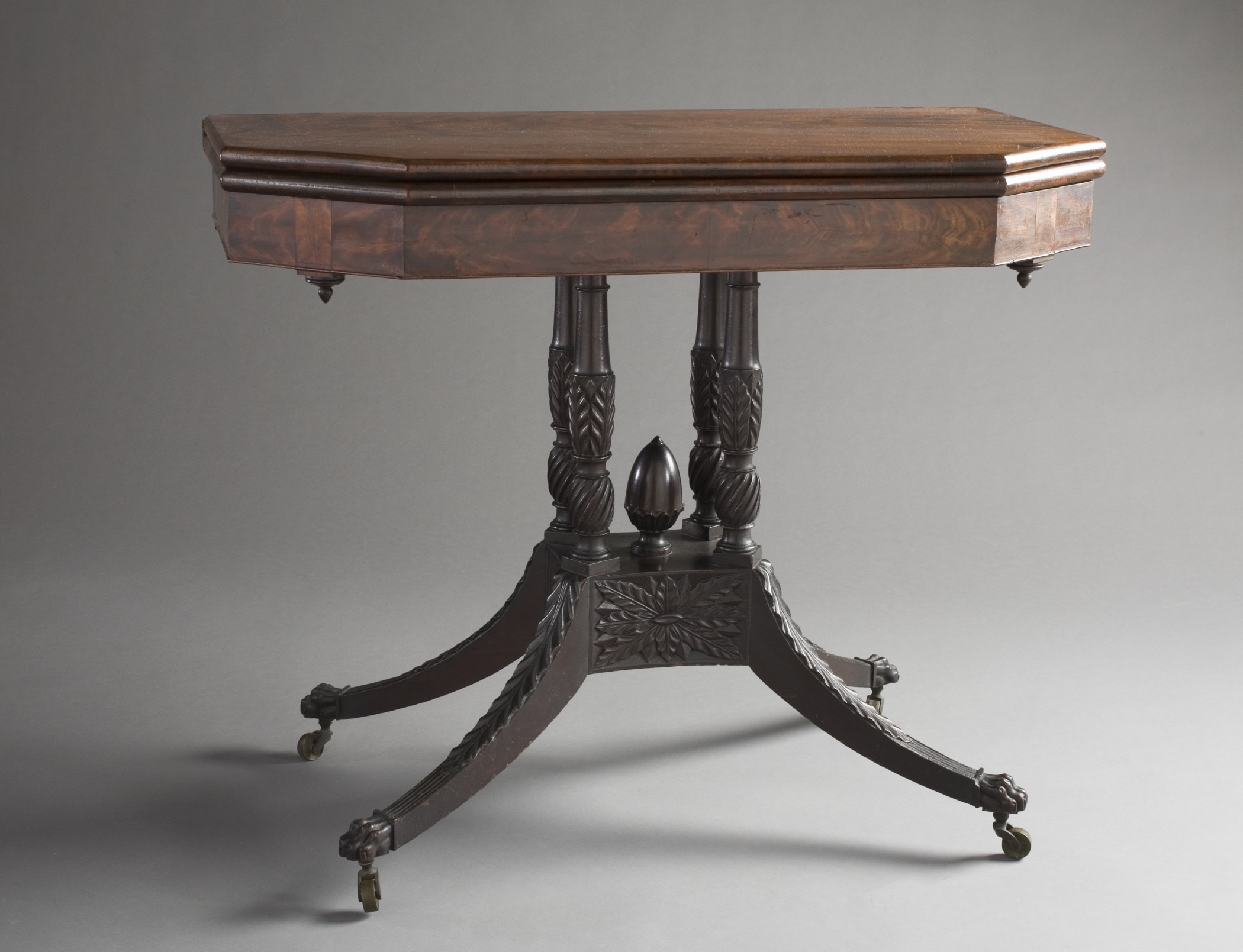
Four-column pedestal card table with pineapple finial; 1815–1820; mahogany, tulip poplar, and pine woods; 74.93 x 92.71 x 46.67 cm; Los Angeles County Museum of Art

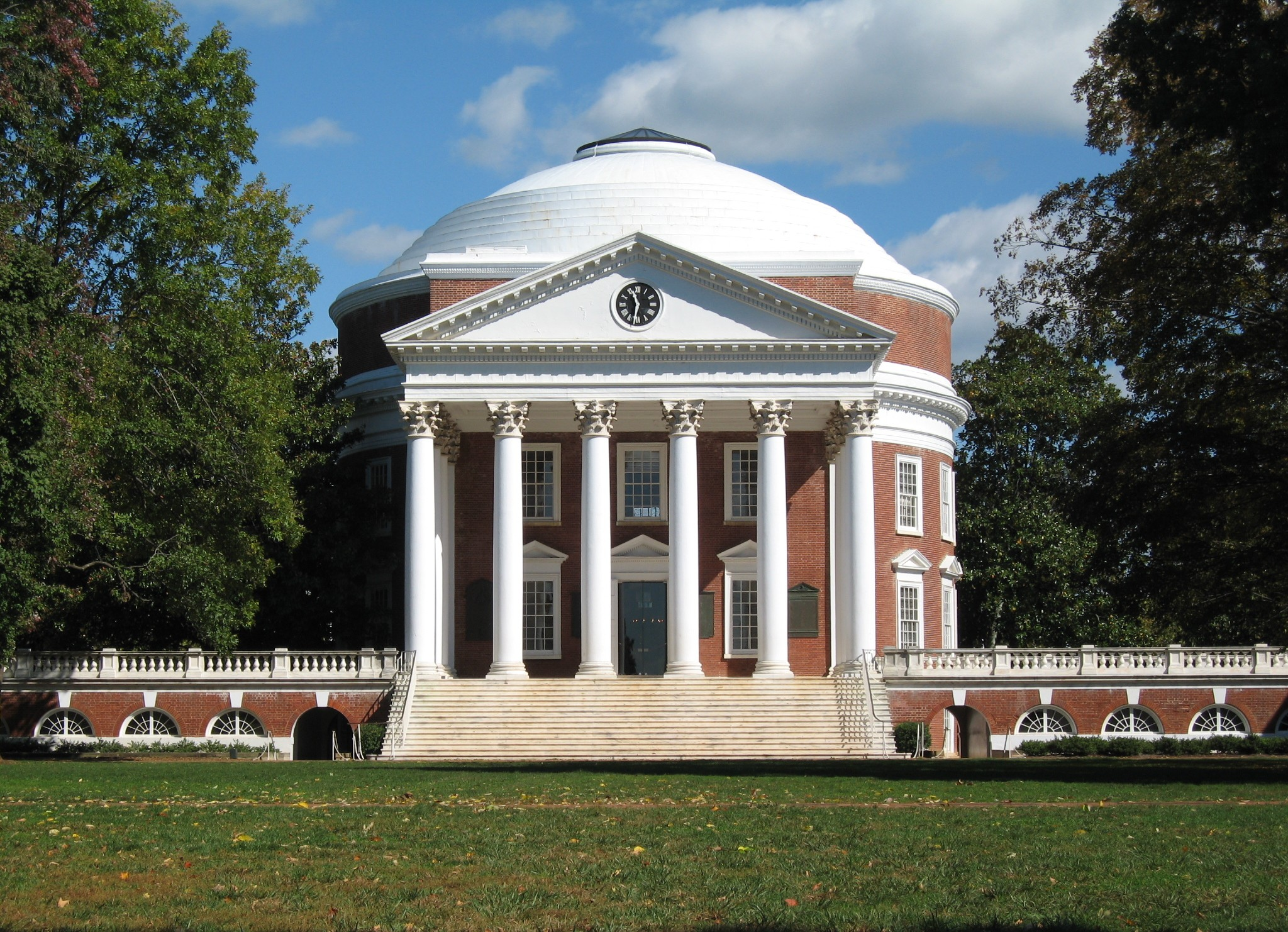
The Rotunda (University of Virginia), Charlottesville, Virginia, by Thomas Jefferson, 1822-1826

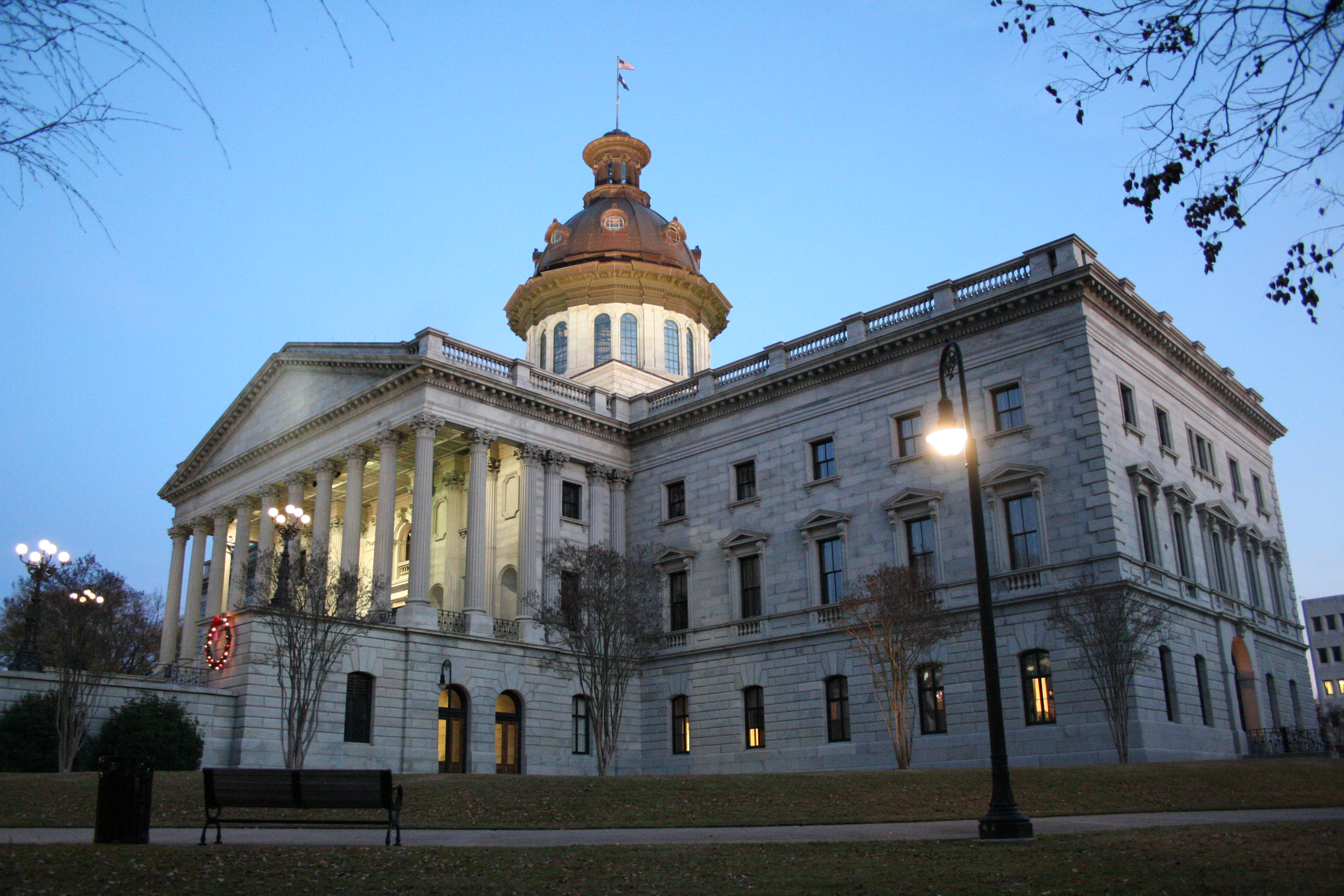
South Carolina State House, Columbia, South Carolina, by John Rudolph Niernsee, 1855

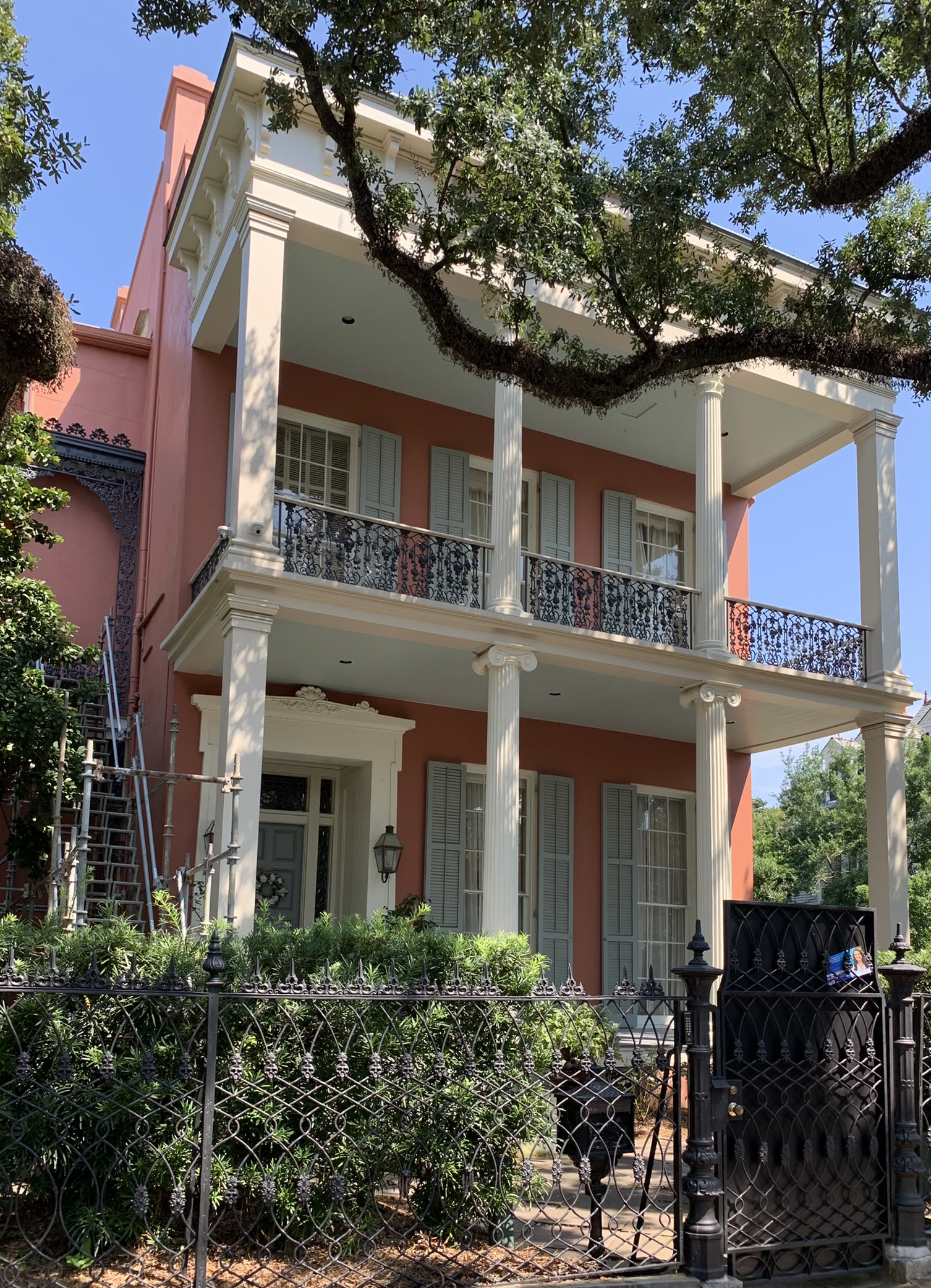
Brevard-Rice House, Garden District, New Orleans, by James Calrow, 1857

On the American continent, architecture and interior decoration have been highly influenced by the styles developed in Europe. The French taste has highly marked its presence in the southern states (after the French Revolution some emigrants have moved here, and in Canada a big part of the population has French origins). The practical spirit and the material situation of the Americans at that time gave the interiors a typic atmosphere. All the American furniture, carpets, tableware, ceramic, and silverware, with all the European influences, and sometimes Islamic, Turkish or Asian, were made in conformity with the American norms, taste, and functional requirements. There have existed in the US a period of the Queen Anne style, and a Chippendale one. A style of its own, the Federal style, has developed completely in the 18th and early 19th centuries, which has flourished being influenced by Britannic taste. Under the impulse of Neoclassicism, architecture, interiors, and furniture have been created. The style, although it has numerous characteristics which differ from state to state, is unitary. The structures of architecture, interiors, and furniture are Classicist, and incorporate Baroque and Rococo influences. The shapes used include rectangles, ovals, and crescents. Stucco or wooden panels on walls and ceilings reproduce Classicist motifs. Furniture tend to be decorated with floral marquetry and bronze or brass inlays (sometimes gilded).

== Gardens ==
In England, Augustan literature had a direct parallel with the Augustan style of landscape design. The links are clearly seen in the work of Alexander Pope. The best surviving examples of Neoclassical English gardens are Chiswick House, Stowe House and Stourhead.

== Fashion ==
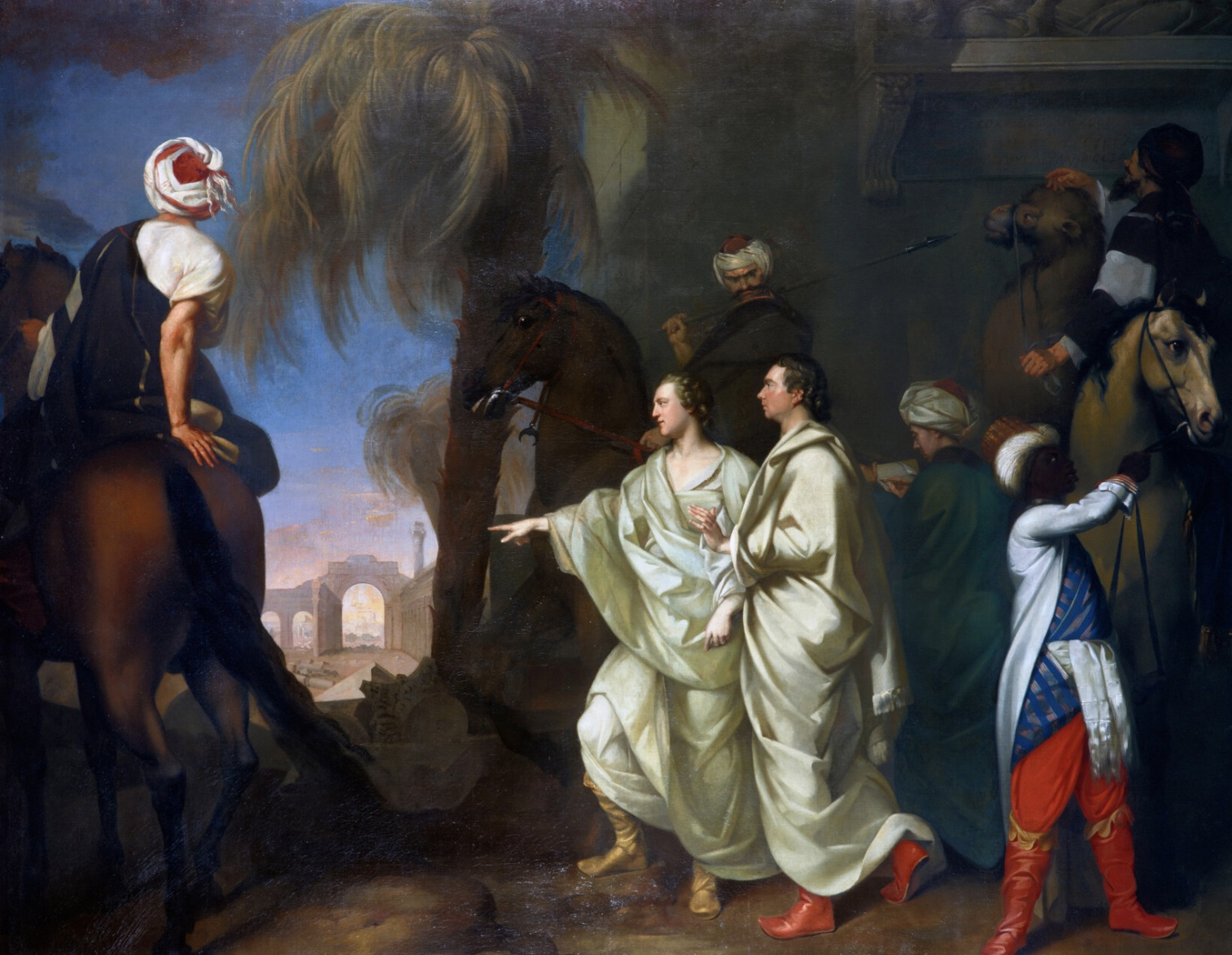
James Dawkins and Robert Wood Discovering the Ruins of Palmyra, by Gavin Hamilton, 1758

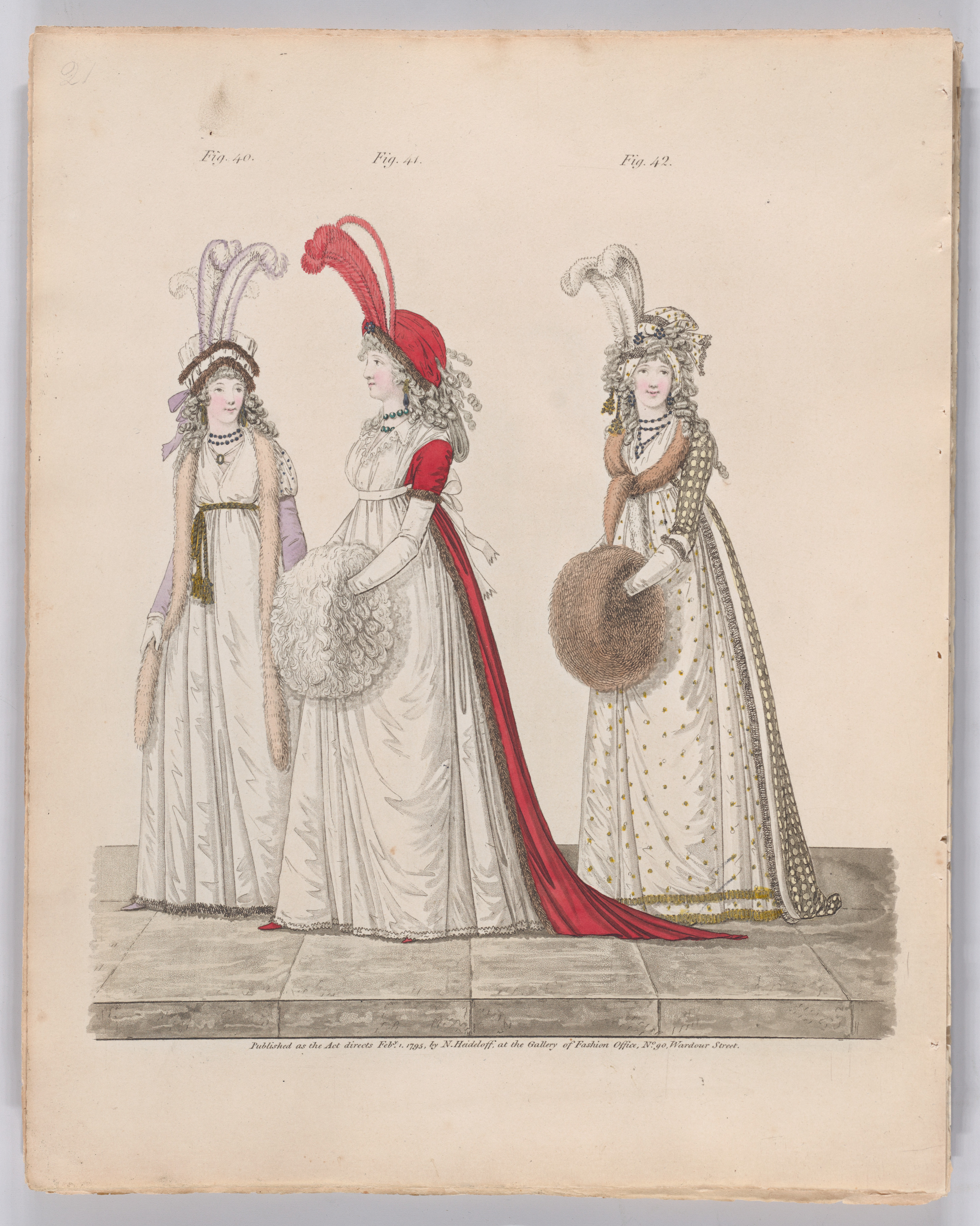
Dresses from the Gallery of Fashion, 1794–1802

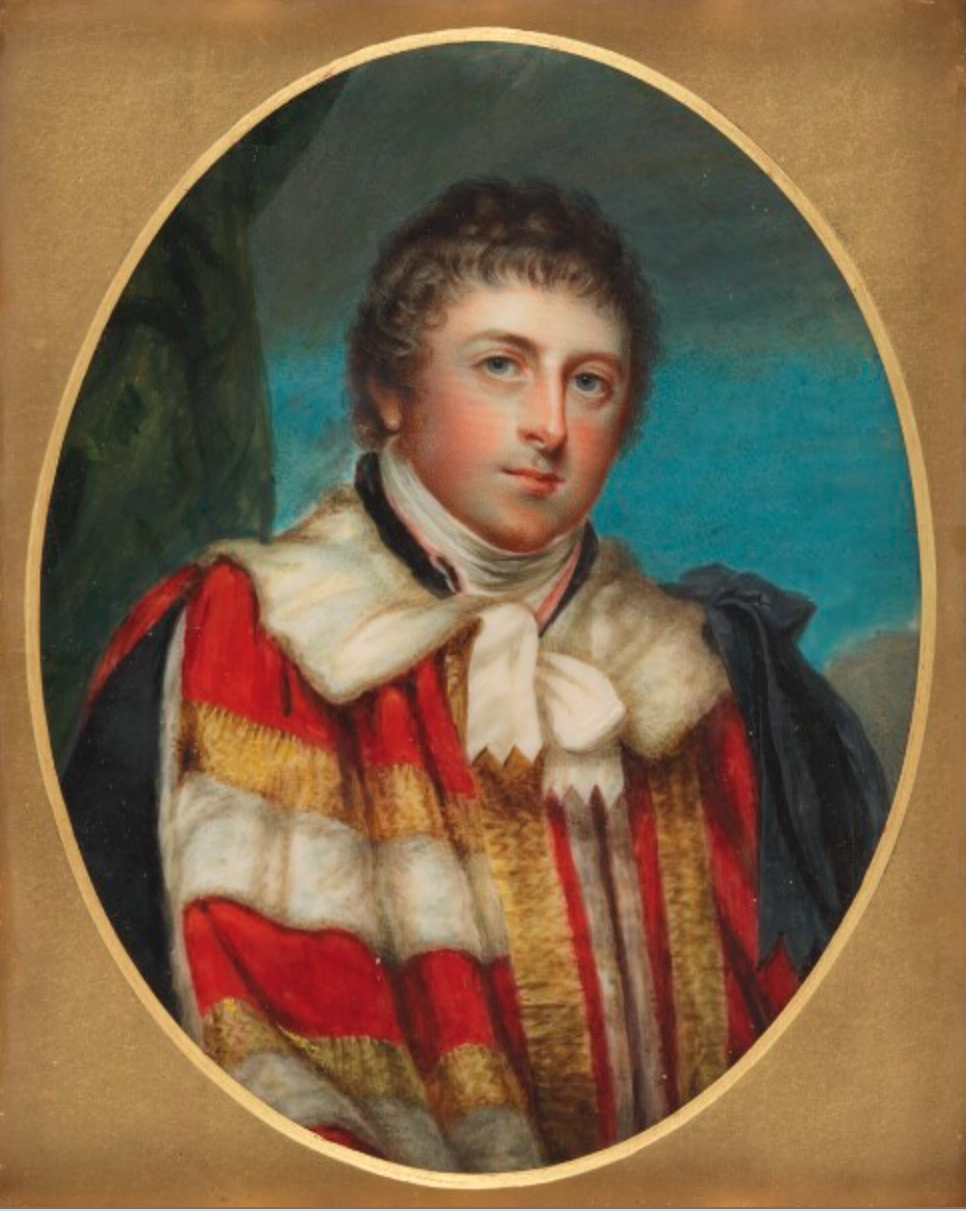
Francis Russell, 5th Duke of Bedford in a Bedford Crop, by William Grimaldi after John Hoppner, early 19th century, based on a work of 1796–1797

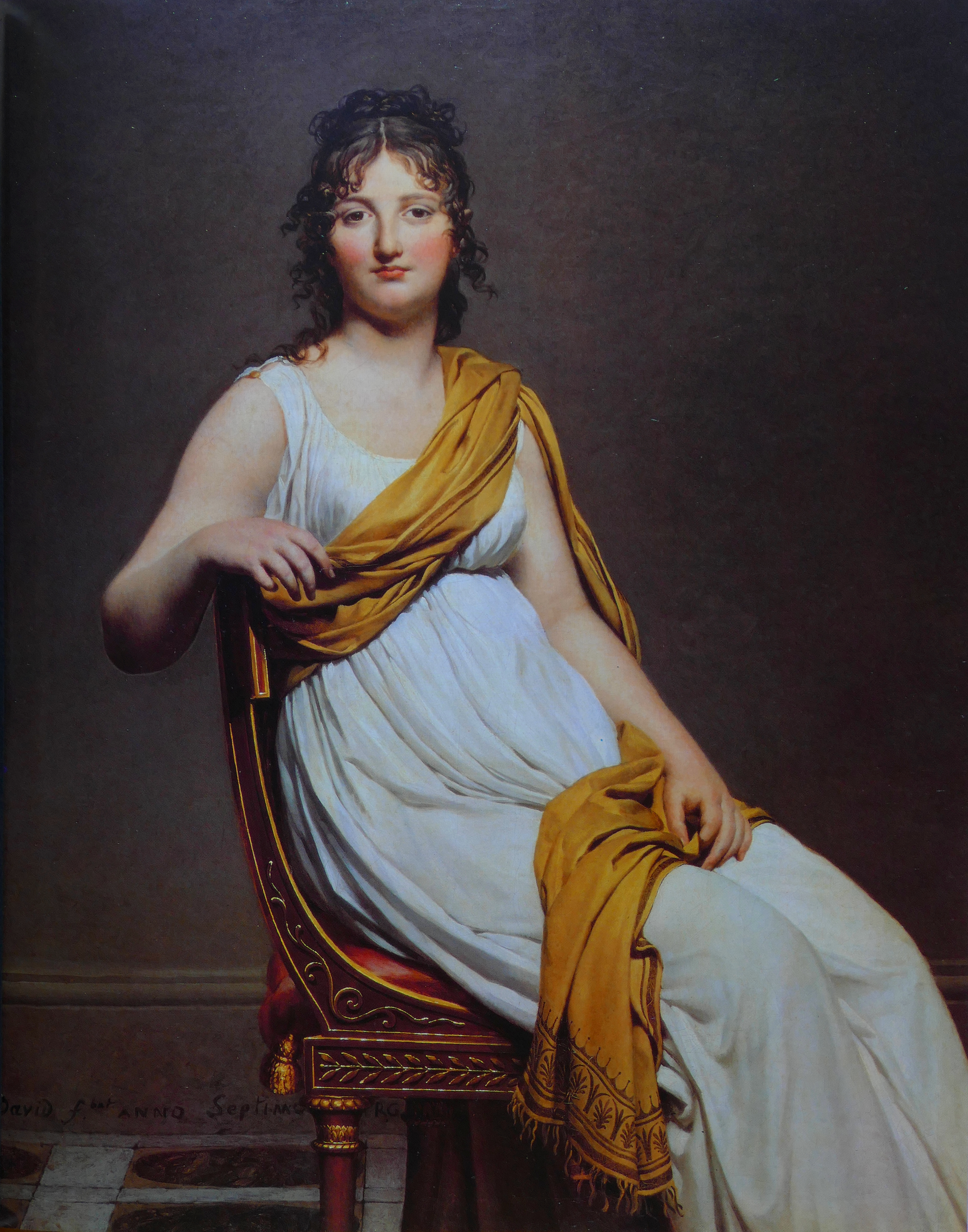
Portrait of Henriette de Verninac by Jacques-Louis David, with clothes and chair in Directoire style. "Year 7": that is, 1798–1799

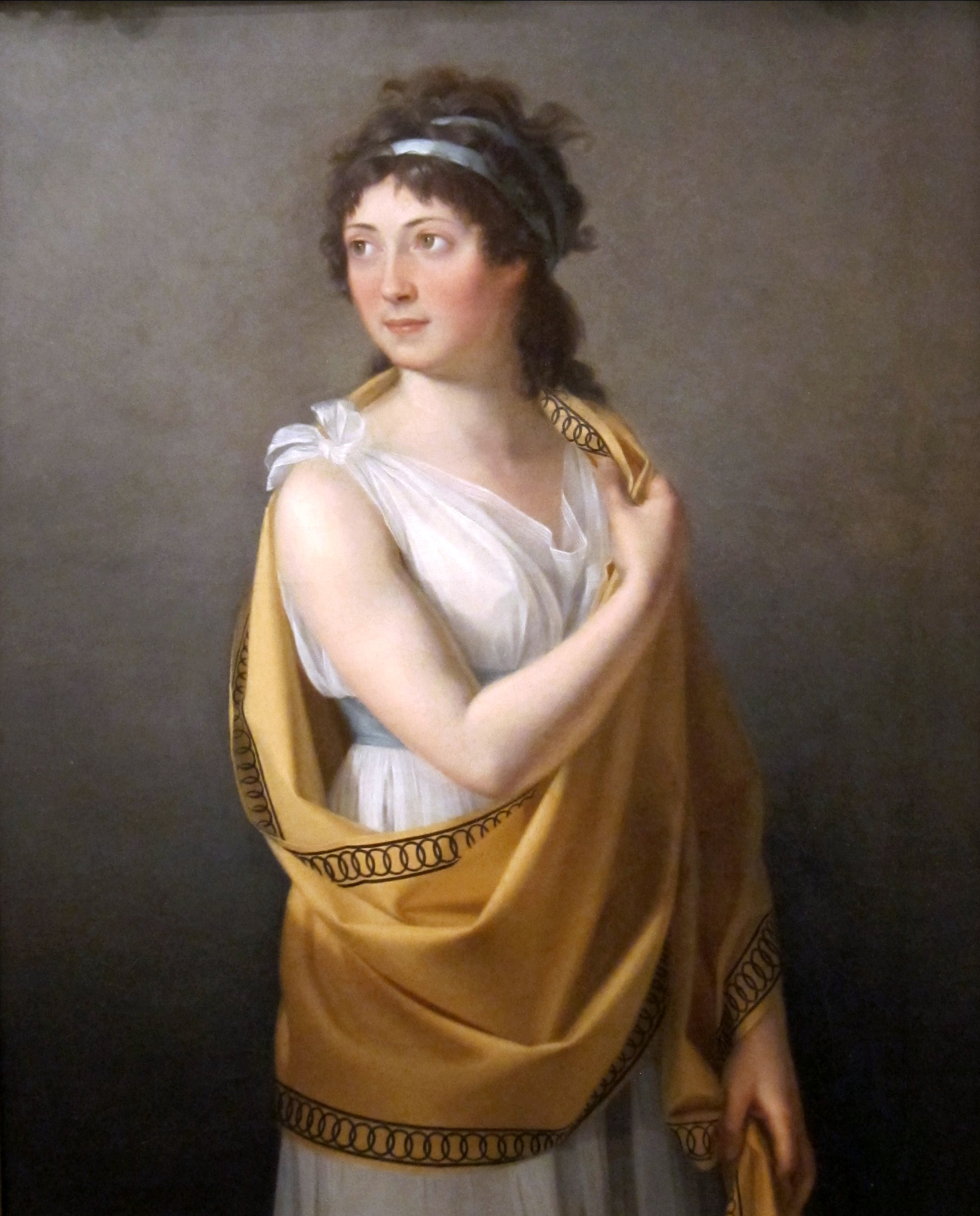
Revolutionary socialite Thérésa Tallien, by Marie-Guillemine Benoist, c.1799

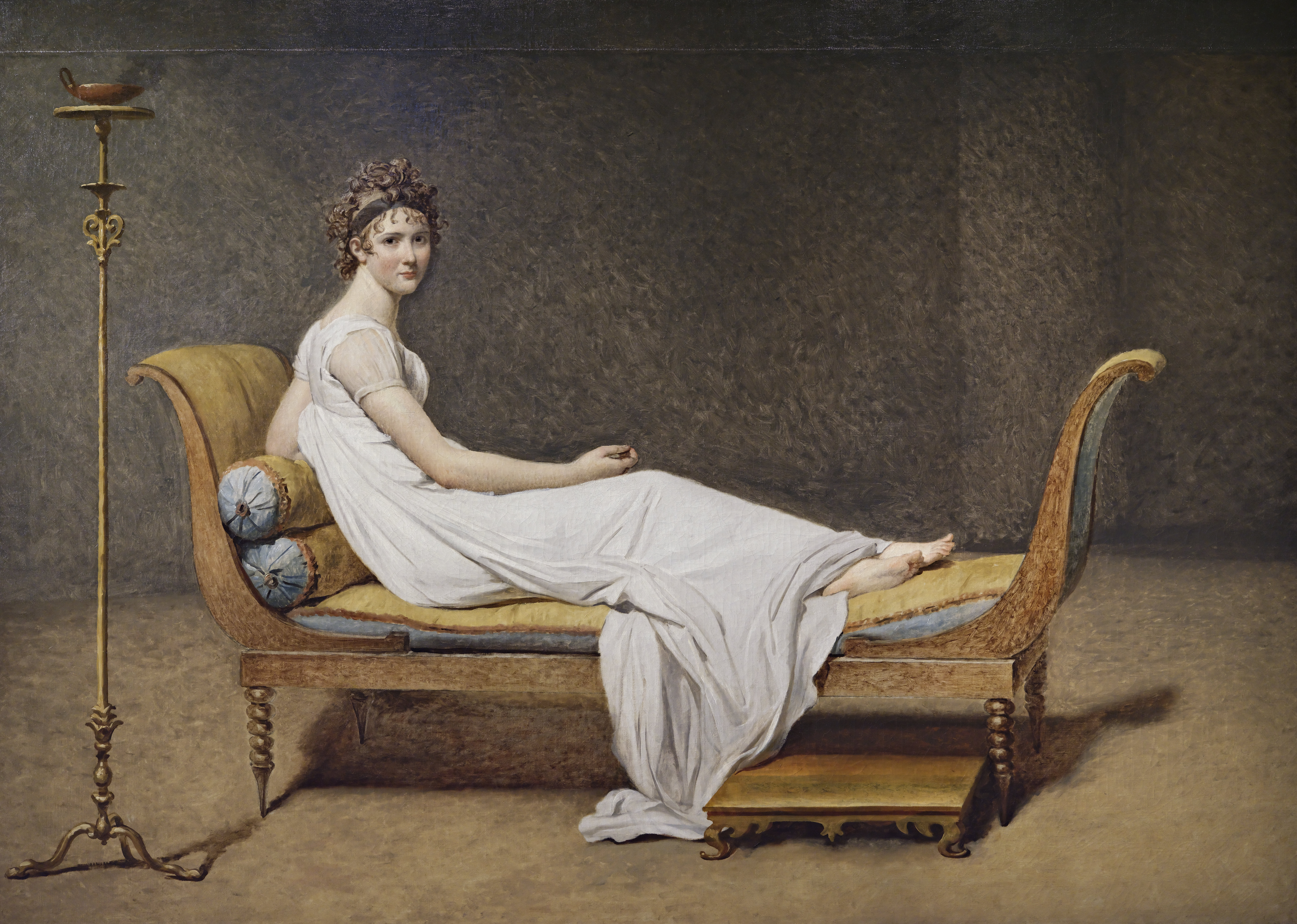
Portrait of Madame Récamier, by Jacques-Louis David, 1800

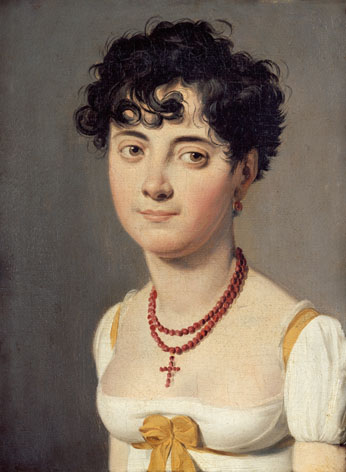
Henriette Victoire Elisabeth d’Avrange, comtesse de Relingue, with a coiffure à la Titus, by Louis-Léopold Boilly, 1810

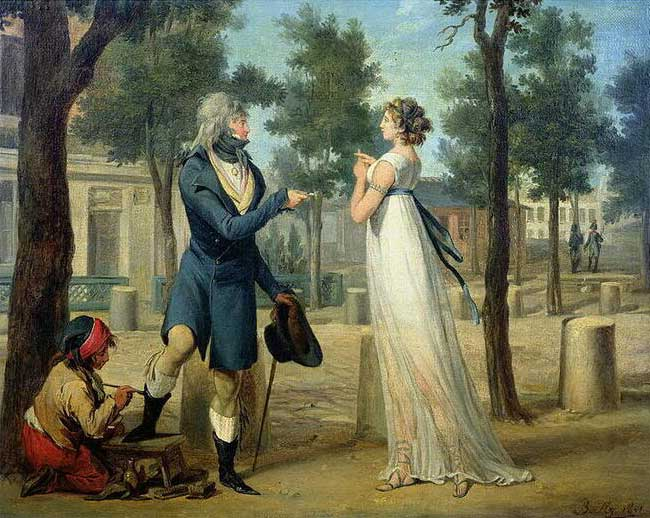
Point de Convention, by Louis-Léopold Boilly, c.1801

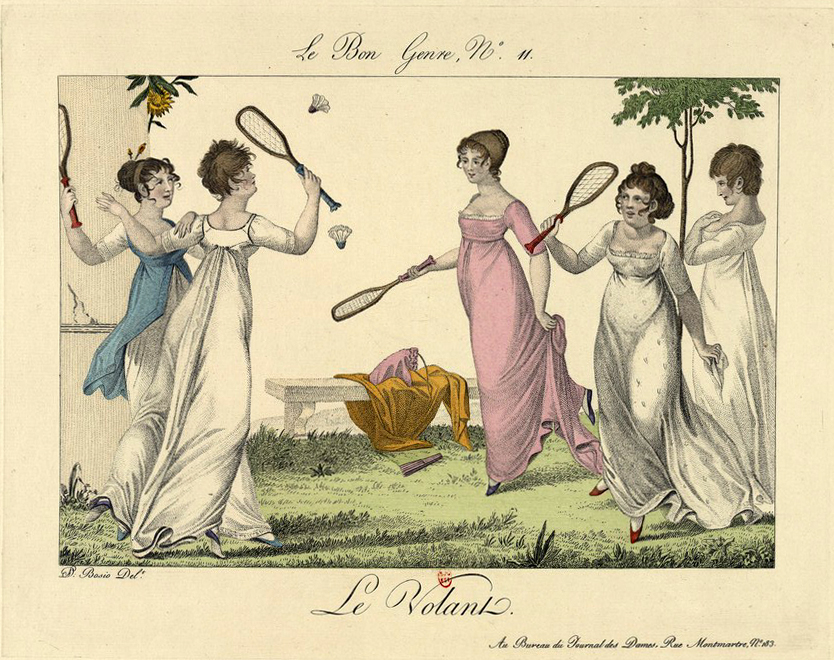
Illustration showing women playing badminton, hand-colored etching from the series Le Bon Genre, by François Joseph Bosio, 1801

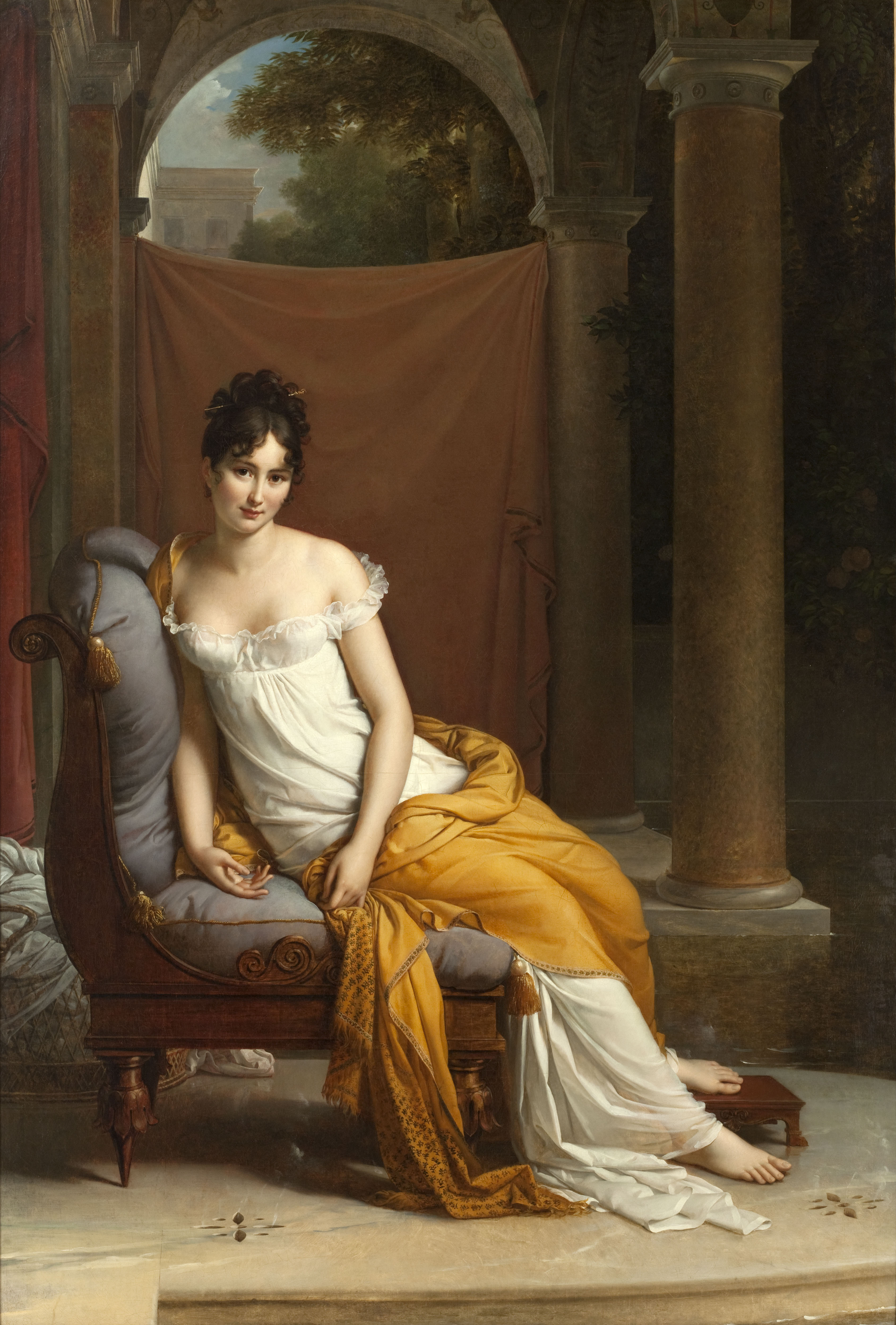
Portrait of Juliette Récamier, by François Gérard, 1802

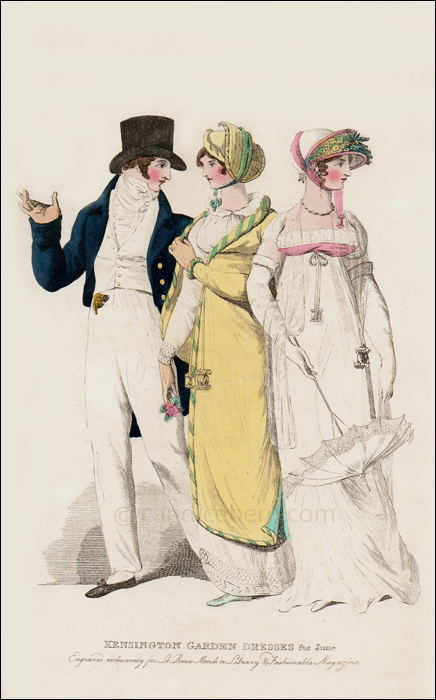
Kensington Garden dresses for June, fashion plate from Le Beau Monde, 1808

In fashion, Neoclassicism influenced the much greater simplicity of women's dresses, and the long-lasting fashion for white, from well before the French Revolution, but it was not until after it that thorough-going attempts to imitate ancient styles became fashionable in France, at least for women. Classical costumes had long been worn by fashionable ladies posing as some figure from Greek or Roman myth in a portrait (in particular there was a rash of such portraits of the young model Emma, Lady Hamilton from the 1780s), but such costumes were only worn for the portrait sitting and masquerade balls until the Revolutionary period, and perhaps, like other exotic styles, as undress at home. But the styles worn in portraits by Juliette Récamier, Joséphine de Beauharnais, Thérésa Tallien and other Parisian trend-setters were for going-out in public as well. Seeing Mme Tallien at the opera, Talleyrand quipped that: "Il n'est pas possible de s'exposer plus somptueusement!" ("One could not be more sumptuously undressed"). In 1788, just before the Revolution, the court portraitist Louise Élisabeth Vigée Le Brun had held a Greek supper where the ladies wore plain white Grecian tunics. Shorter classical hairstyles, where possible with curls, were less controversial and very widely adopted, and hair was now uncovered even outdoors; except for evening dress, bonnets or other coverings had typically been worn even indoors before. Thin Greek-style ribbons or fillets were used to tie or decorate the hair instead.

Very light and loose dresses, usually white and often with shockingly bare arms, rose sheer from the ankle to just below the bodice, where there was a strongly emphasized thin hem or tie round the body, often in a different colour. The shape is now often known as the Empire silhouette although it predates the First French Empire of Napoleon, but his first Empress Joséphine de Beauharnais was influential in spreading it around Europe. A long rectangular shawl or wrap, very often plain red but with a decorated border in portraits, helped in colder weather, and was apparently laid around the midriff when seated—for which sprawling semi-recumbent postures were favoured. By the start of the 19th century, such styles had spread widely across Europe.

Neoclassical fashion for men was far more problematic, and never really took off other than for hair, where it played an important role in the shorter styles that finally despatched the use of wigs, and then white hair-powder, for younger men. The trouser had been the symbol of the barbarian to the Greeks and Romans, but outside the painter's or, especially, the sculptor's studio, few men were prepared to abandon it. Indeed, the period saw the triumph of the pure trouser, or pantaloon, over the culotte or knee-breeches of the Ancien Régime. Even when David designed a new French "national costume" at the request of the government during the height of the Revolutionary enthusiasm for changing everything in 1792, it included fairly tight leggings under a coat that stopped above the knee. A high proportion of well-to-do young men spent much of the key period in military service because of the French Revolutionary Wars, and military uniform, which began to emphasize jackets that were short at the front, giving a full view of tight-fitting trousers, was often worn when not on duty, and influenced civilian male styles.

The trouser-problem had been recognised by artists as a barrier to creating contemporary history paintings; like other elements of contemporary dress they were seen as irredeemably ugly and unheroic by many artists and critics. Various stratagems were used to avoid depicting them in modern scenes. In James Dawkins and Robert Wood Discovering the Ruins of Palmyra (1758) by Gavin Hamilton, the two gentleman antiquaries are shown in toga-like Arab robes. In Watson and the Shark (1778) by John Singleton Copley, the main figure could plausibly be shown nude, and the composition is such that of the eight other men shown, only one shows a single breeched leg prominently. However the Americans Copley and Benjamin West led the artists who successfully showed that trousers could be used in heroic scenes, with works like West's The Death of General Wolfe (1770) and Copley's The Death of Major Peirson, 6 January 1781 (1783), although the trouser was still being carefully avoided in The Raft of the Medusa, completed in 1819.

Classically inspired male hairstyles included the Bedford Crop, arguably the precursor of most plain modern male styles, which was invented by the radical politician Francis Russell, 5th Duke of Bedford as a protest against a tax on hair powder; he encouraged his friends to adopt it by betting them they would not. Another influential style (or group of styles) was named by the French "coiffure à la Titus" after Titus Junius Brutus (not in fact the Roman Emperor Titus as often assumed), with hair short and layered but somewhat piled up on the crown, often with restrained quiffs or locks hanging down; variants are familiar from the hair of both Napoleon and George IV of the United Kingdom. The style was supposed to have been introduced by the actor François-Joseph Talma, who upstaged his wigged co-actors when appearing in productions of works such as Voltaire's Brutus (about Lucius Junius Brutus, who orders the execution of his son Titus). In 1799 a Parisian fashion magazine reported that even bald men were adopting Titus wigs, and the style was also worn by women, the Journal de Paris reporting in 1802 that "more than half of elegant women were wearing their hair or wig à la Titus.

== Music ==
Neoclassicism in music is a 20th-century movement; in this case it is the Classical and Baroque musical styles of the 17th and 18th centuries, with their fondness for Greek and Roman themes, that were being revived, not the music of the ancient world itself. (The early 20th century had not yet distinguished the Baroque period in music, on which Neoclassical composers mainly drew, from what we now call the Classical period.) The movement was a reaction in the first part of the 20th century to the disintegrating chromaticism of late-Romanticism and Impressionism, emerging in parallel with musical Modernism, which sought to abandon key tonality altogether. It manifested a desire for cleanness and simplicity of style, which allowed for quite dissonant paraphrasing of classical procedures, but sought to blow away the cobwebs of Romanticism and the twilit glimmerings of Impressionism in favour of bold rhythms, assertive harmony and clean-cut sectional forms, coinciding with the vogue for reconstructed "classical" dancing and costume in ballet and physical education.

The 17th–18th century dance suite had had a minor revival before World War I but the Neoclassicists were not altogether happy with unmodified diatonicism, and tended to emphasise the bright dissonance of suspensions and ornaments, the angular qualities of 17th-century modal harmony and the energetic lines of countrapuntal part-writing. Ottorino Respighi's Ancient Airs and Dances (1917) led the way for the sort of sound to which the Neoclassicists aspired. Although the practice of borrowing musical styles from the past has not been uncommon throughout musical history, art musics have gone through periods where musicians used modern techniques coupled with older forms or harmonies to create new kinds of works. Notable compositional characteristics are: referencing diatonic tonality, conventional forms (dance suites, concerti grossi, sonata forms, etc.), the idea of absolute music untramelled by descriptive or emotive associations, the use of light musical textures, and a conciseness of musical expression. In classical music, this was most notably perceived between the 1920s and the 1950s. Igor Stravinsky is the best-known composer using this style; he effectively began the musical revolution with his Bach-like Octet for Wind Instruments (1923). A particular individual work that represents this style well is Prokofiev's Classical Symphony No. 1 in D, which is reminiscent of the symphonic style of Haydn or Mozart. Neoclassical ballet as innovated by George Balanchine de-cluttered the Russian Imperial style in terms of costume, steps and narrative, while also introducing technical innovations.

== Later Neoclassicism and continuations ==
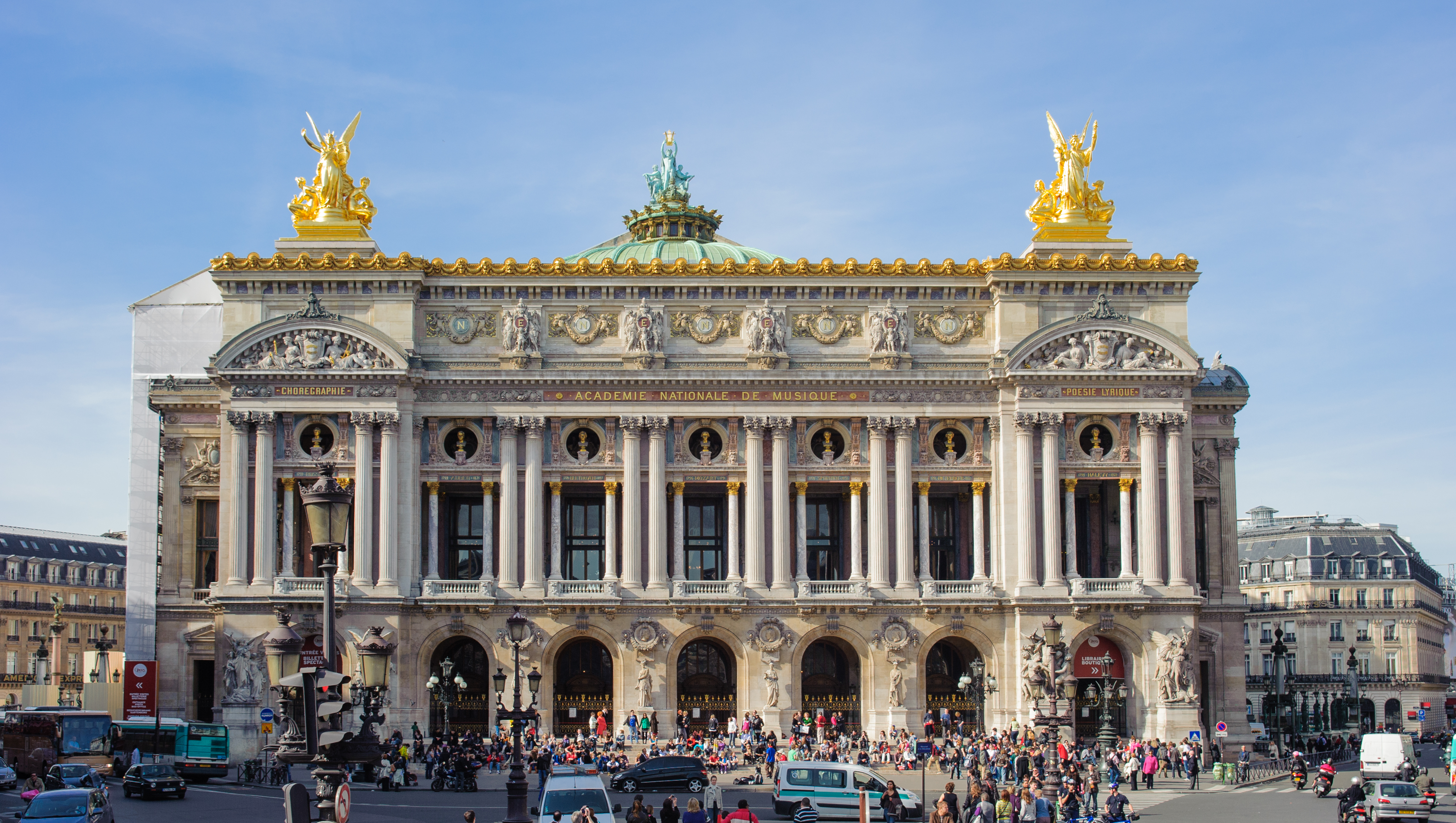
Beaux-Arts - Exterior of the Palais Garnier, Paris, by Charles Garnier, 1860–1875

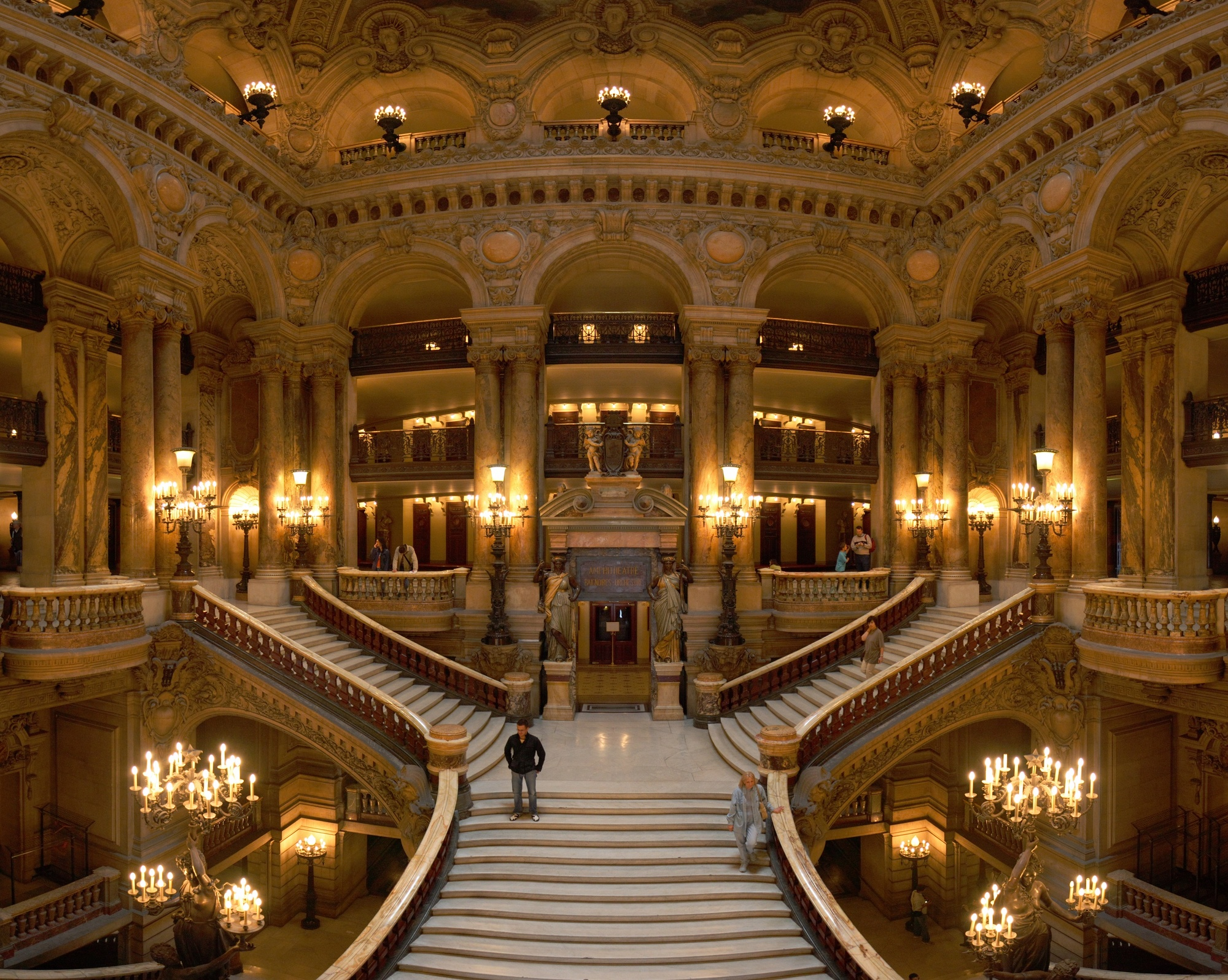
Beaux-Arts - Grand stairs of the Palais Garnier, by Charles Garnier, 1860–1875

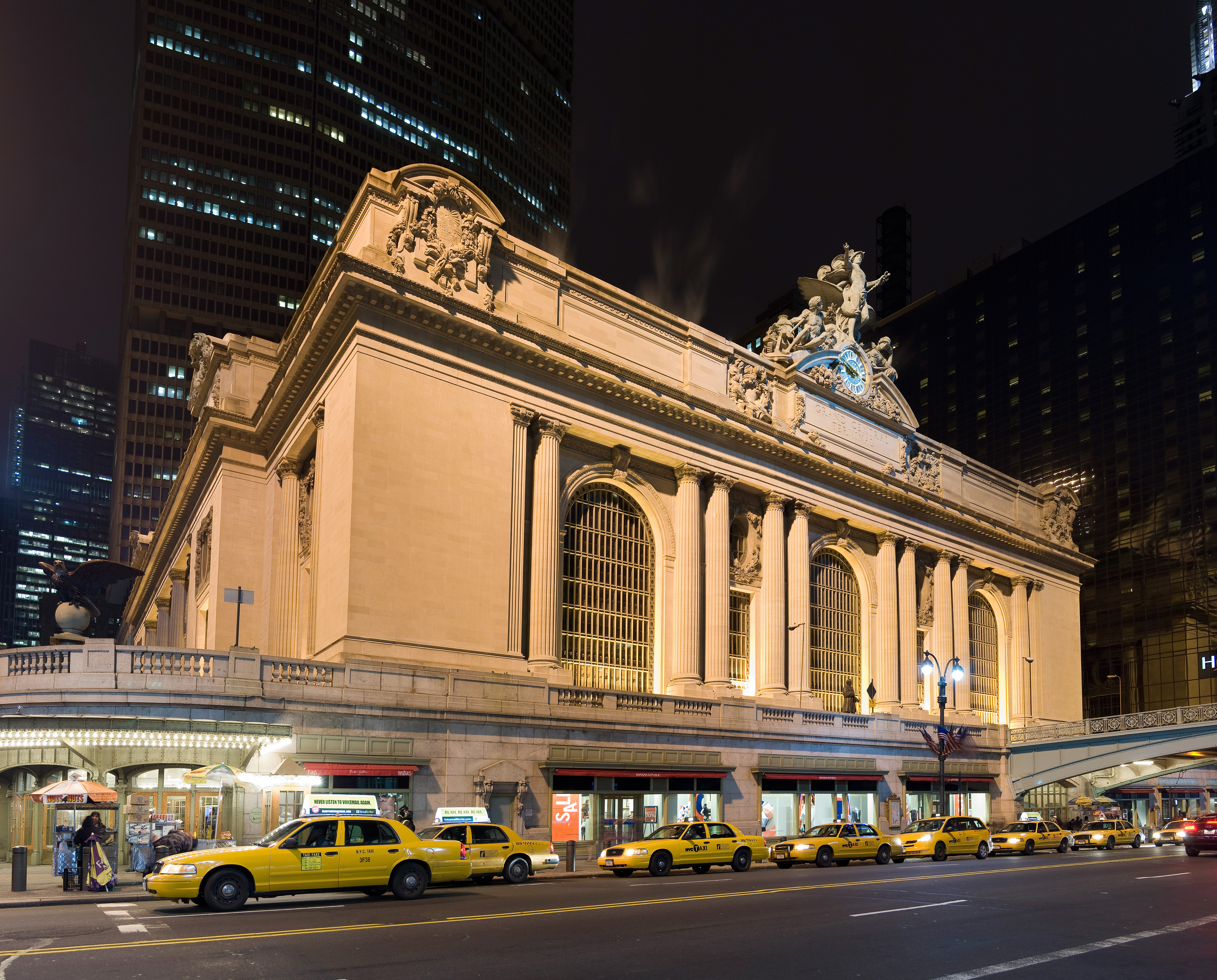
Beaux-Arts - Grand Central Terminal, New York City, by Reed and Stem and Warren and Wetmore, 1903

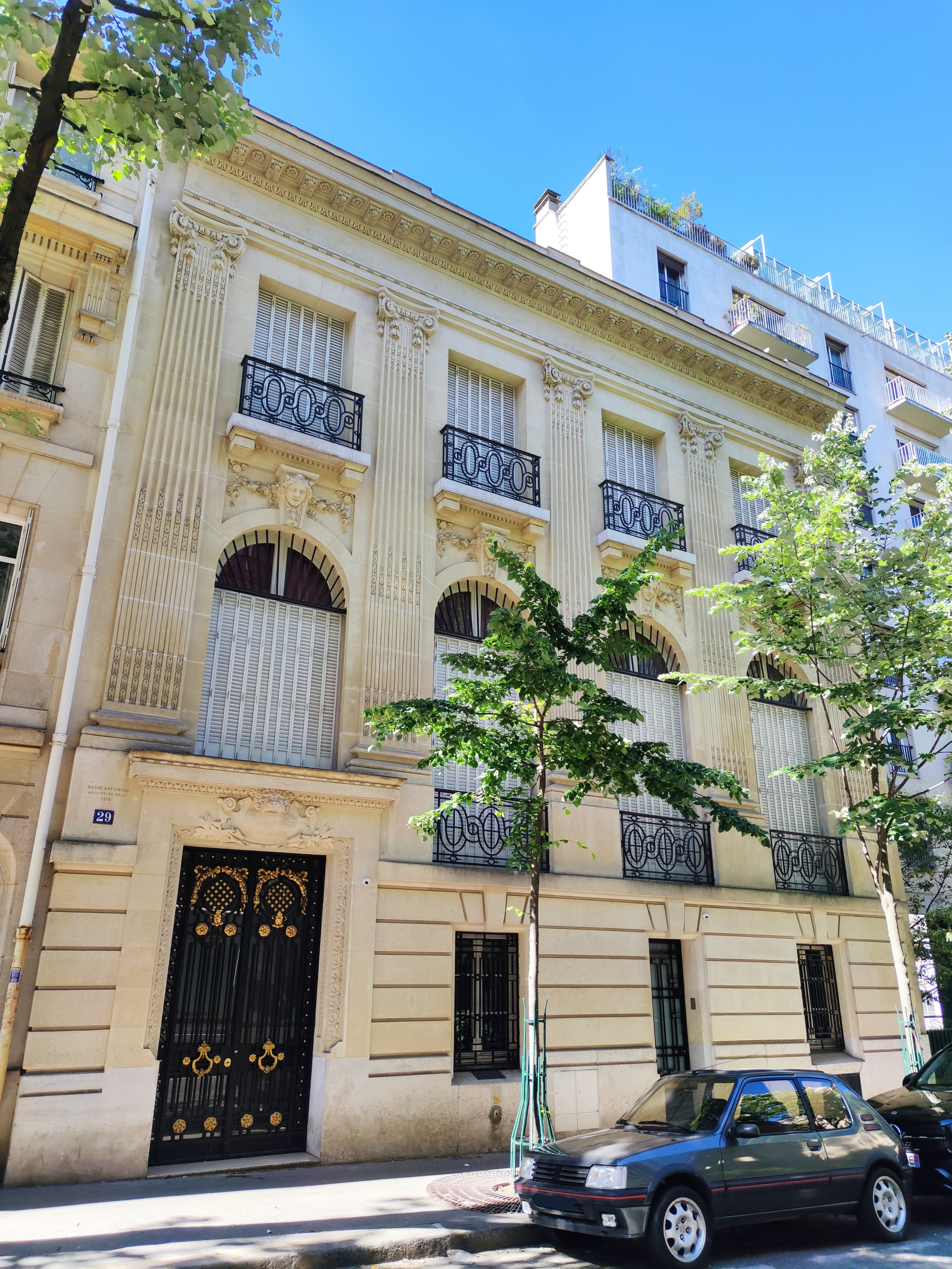
Beaux-Arts - Hôtel Roxoroid de Belfort, Paris, 1911, by André Arfvidson

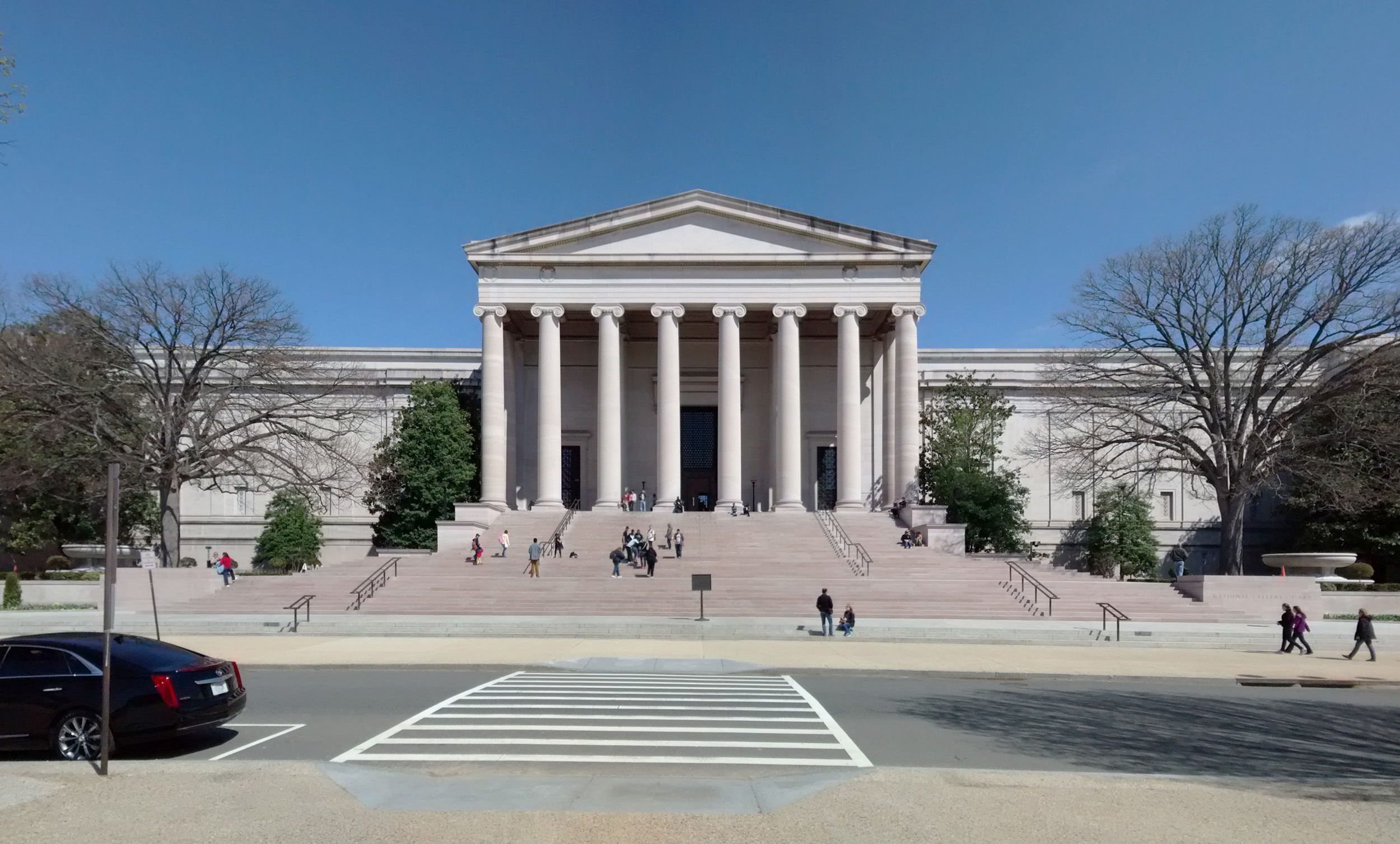
Late Neoclassical - The West building of the National Gallery of Art, Washington, D.C., US, by John Russell Pope, 1941

After the middle of the 19th century, Neoclassicism starts to no longer be the main style, being replaced by Eclecticism of Classical styles. The Palais Garnier in Paris is a good example of this, since despite being predominantly Neoclassical, it features elements and ornaments taken from Baroque and Renaissance architecture. This practice was frequent in late 19th and early 20th century architecture, before World War I. Besides Neoclassicism, the Beaux-Arts de Paris well known for this eclecticism of Classical styles.

Pablo Picasso experimented with classicizing motifs in the years immediately following World War I.

In American architecture, Neoclassicism was one expression of the American Renaissance movement, ca. 1890–1917; its last manifestation was in Beaux-Arts architecture, and its final large public projects were the Lincoln Memorial (highly criticized at the time), the National Gallery of Art in Washington, D.C. (also heavily criticized by the architectural community as being backward thinking and old fashioned in its design), and the American Museum of Natural History's Roosevelt Memorial. These were considered stylistic anachronisms when they were finished. In the British Raj, Sir Edwin Lutyens' monumental city planning for New Delhi marks the sunset of Neoclassicism. World War II was to shatter most longing for (and imitation of) a mythical time.

There was an entire 20th-century movement in the non-visual arts which was also called Neoclassicism. It encompassed at least music, philosophy and literature. It was between the end of World War I and the end of World War II. (For information on the musical aspects, see 20th-century classical music and Neoclassicism in music. For information on the philosophical aspects, see Great Books.)

This literary Neoclassical movement rejected the extreme romanticism of (for example) Dada, in favour of restraint, religion (specifically Christianity) and a reactionary political program. Although the foundations for this movement in English literature were laid by T. E. Hulme, the most famous Neoclassicists were T. S. Eliot and Wyndham Lewis. In Russia, the movement crystallized as early as 1910 under the name of Acmeism, with Anna Akhmatova and Osip Mandelshtam as the leading representatives.

=== Art Deco ===
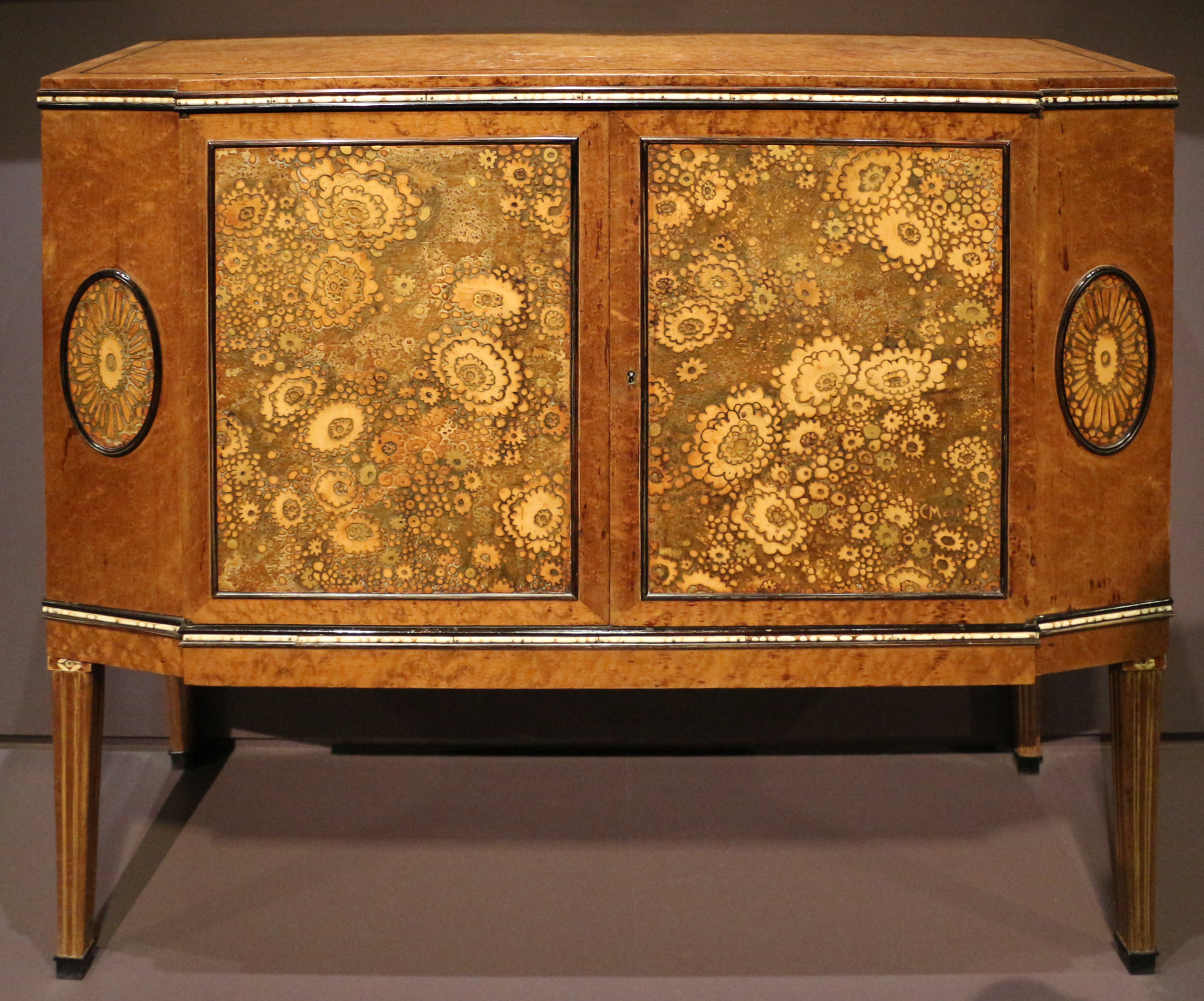
Chest of drawers, a highly simplified reinterpretation of the Louis XVI style; by Clément Mère; 1910; maple, ebony, leather and ivory; 87.5 x 96 x 37 cm; Musée d'Orsay, Paris

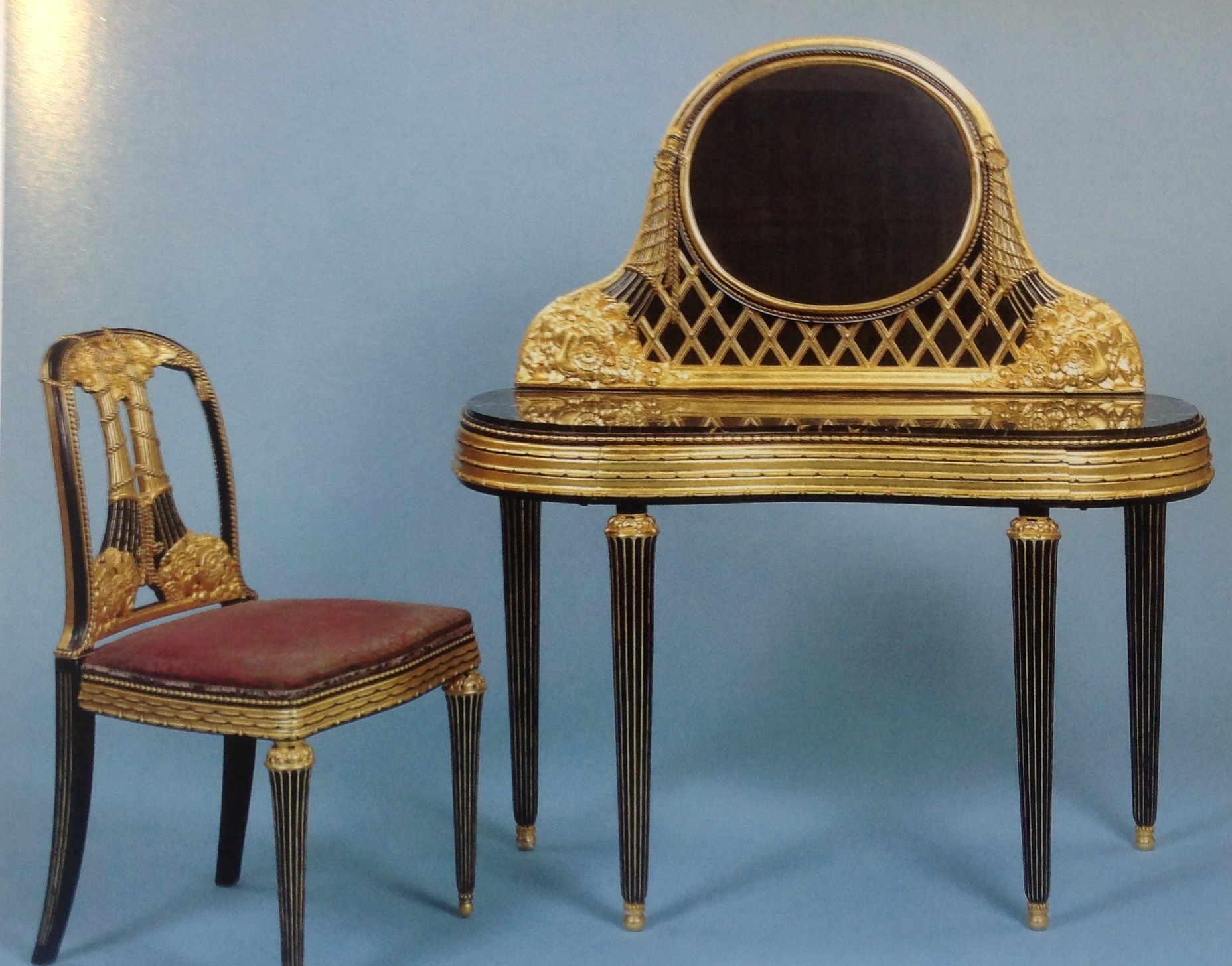
Dressing table and chair, a reinterpretation of the Louis XVI style; by Paul Follot; 1919; marble and encrusted, lacquered, and gilded wood; unknown dimensions; Musée d'Art Moderne de Paris

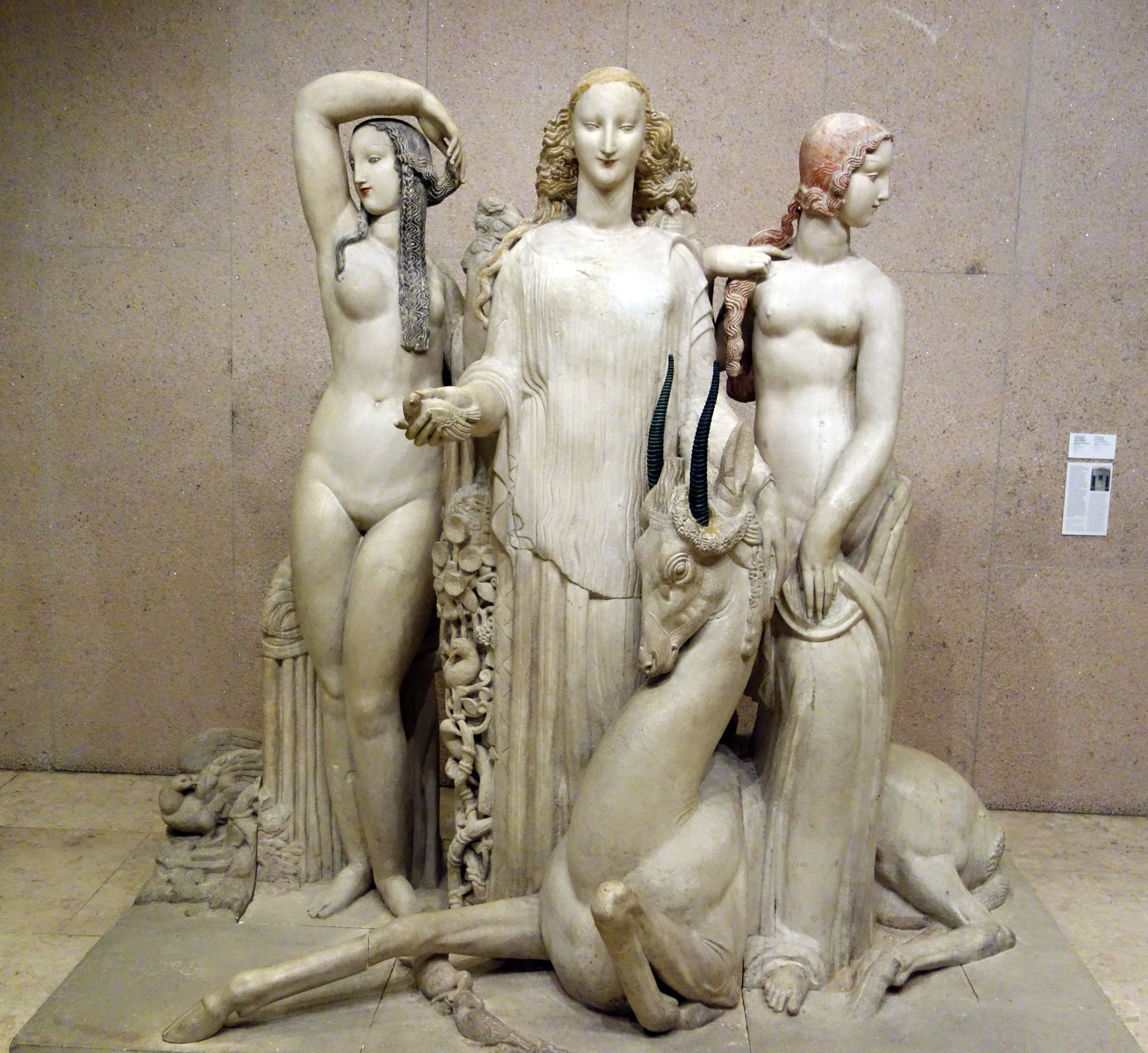
Hommage à Jean Goujon; by Alfred Janniot; 1919–1924; limestone partially coloured; 220 x 235 x 129 cm; Calouste Gulbenkian Museum, Lisbon, Portugal

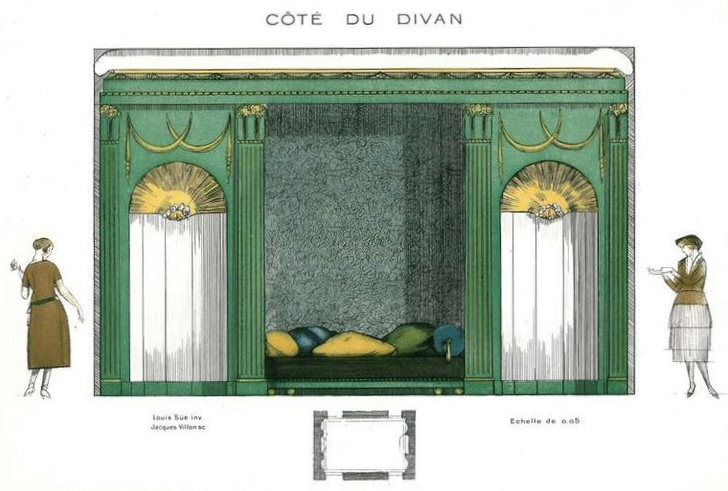
Plate with design for an interior from the collection of projects Architectures, by Louis Süe and André Mare, 1921

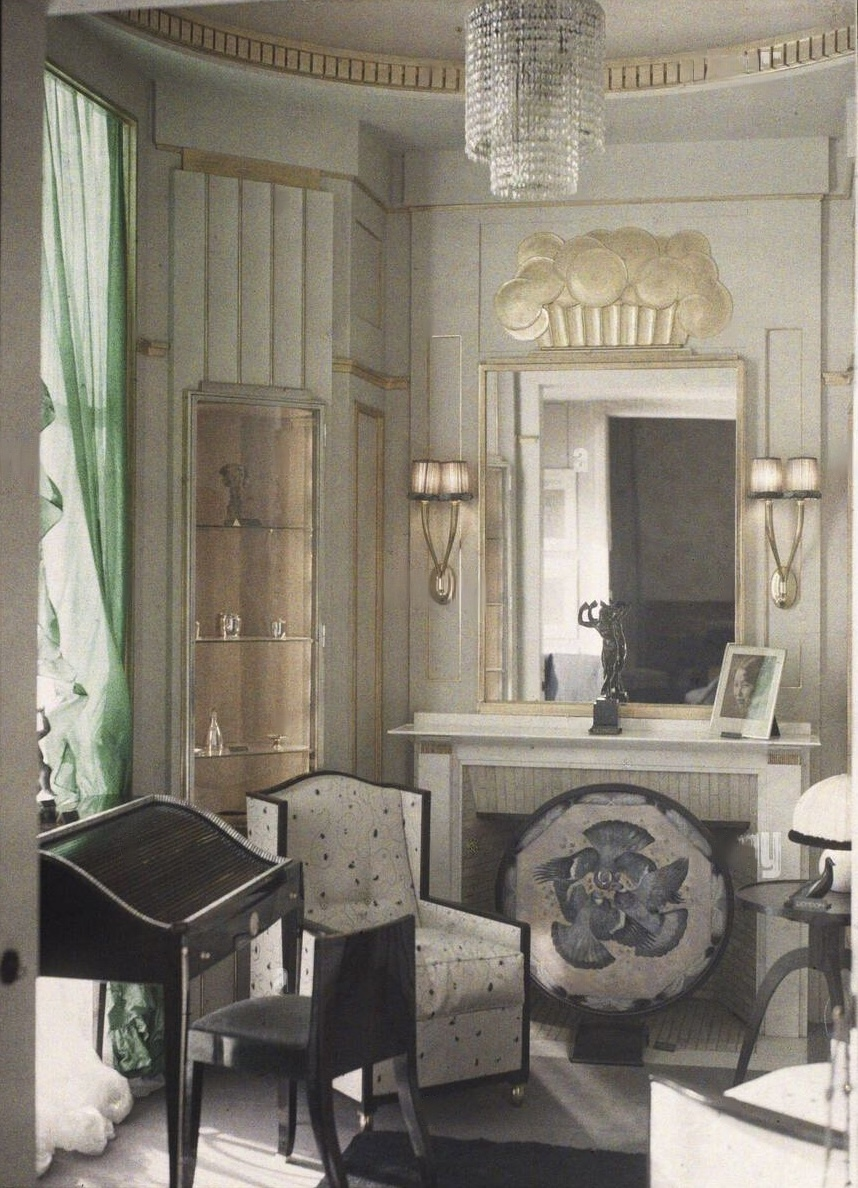
Boudoir from the Hôtel du Collectionneur, a highly simplified reinterpretation of the Louis XVI style, at the 1925 Paris Exhibition, by Émile-Jacques Ruhlmann

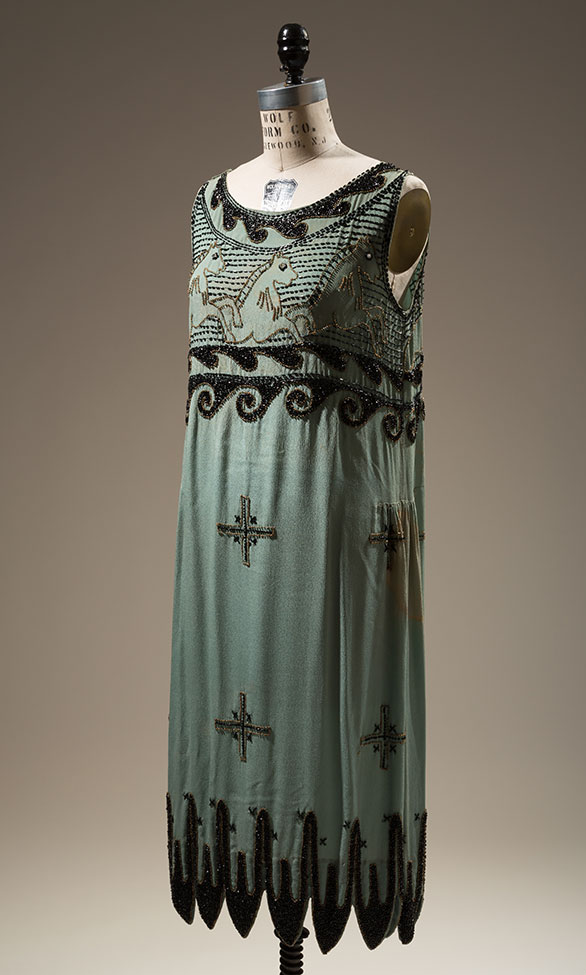
"Little Horses" dress; by Madeleine Vionnet; 1925; rayon crepe, black and gold seed beads; Museum at the Fashion Institute of Technology, New York

Palais de Tokyo, Paris, by André Aubert and Marcel Dastugue, 1937

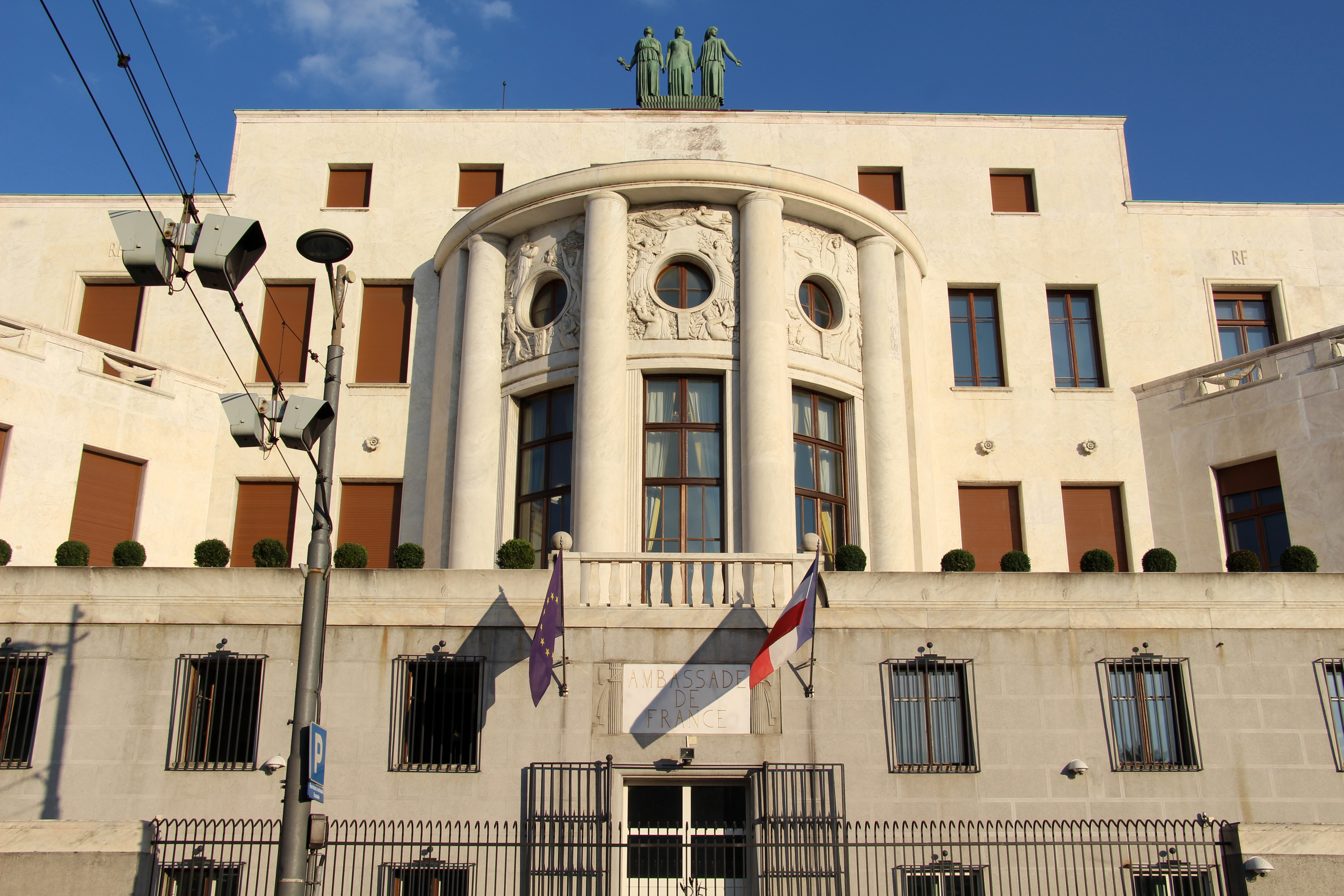
Embassy of France, Belgrade, Serbia, by Roger-Henri Expert with Josif Najman as assistant, designed in 1926, built in 1939

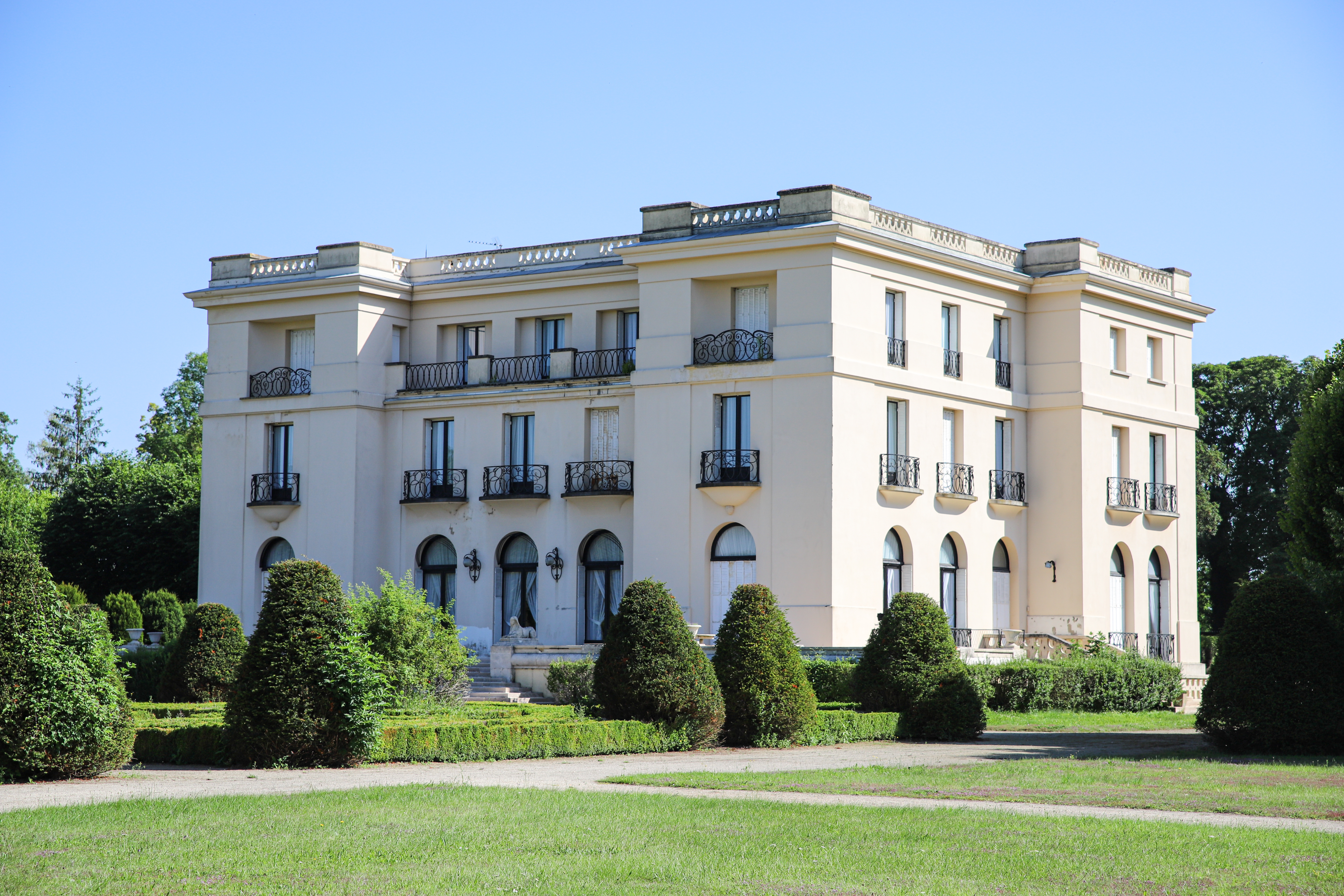
Château de Sept-Saulx, Grand Est, a highly simplified reinterpretation of the Louis XVI style, France, by Louis Süe, 1928-1929

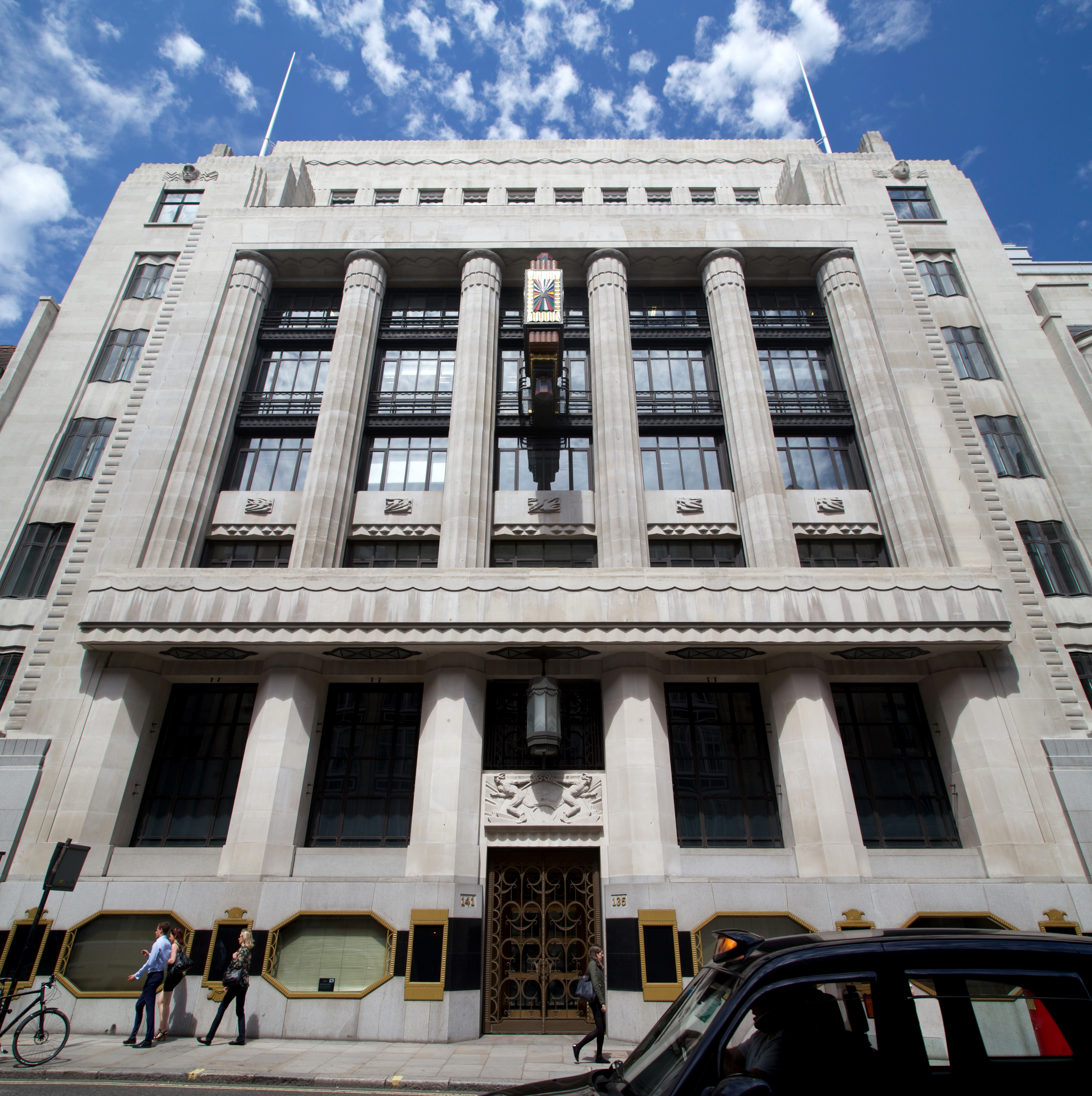
Daily Telegraph Building, London, by Charles Ernest Elcock, after consulting with Thomas S. Tait, 1928

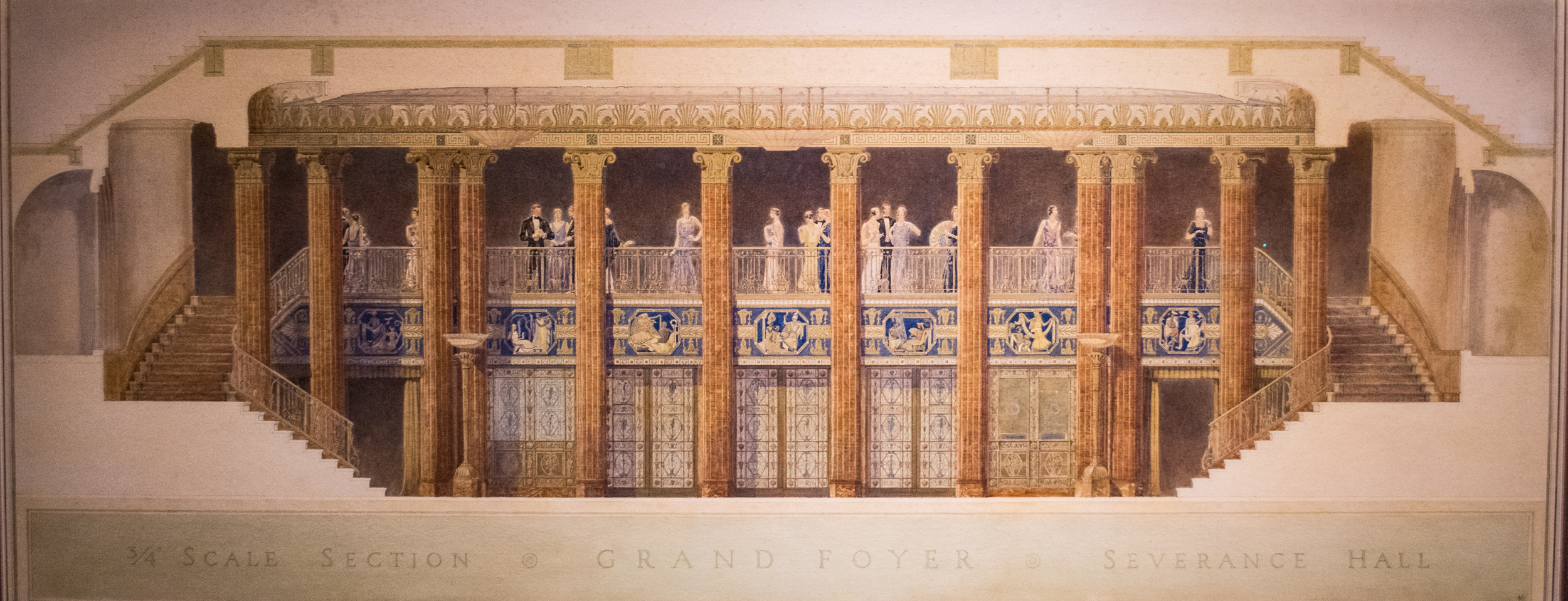
Design for Severance Hall grand foyer of the Severance Hall, Cleveland, US, by Walker and Weeks, c.1930

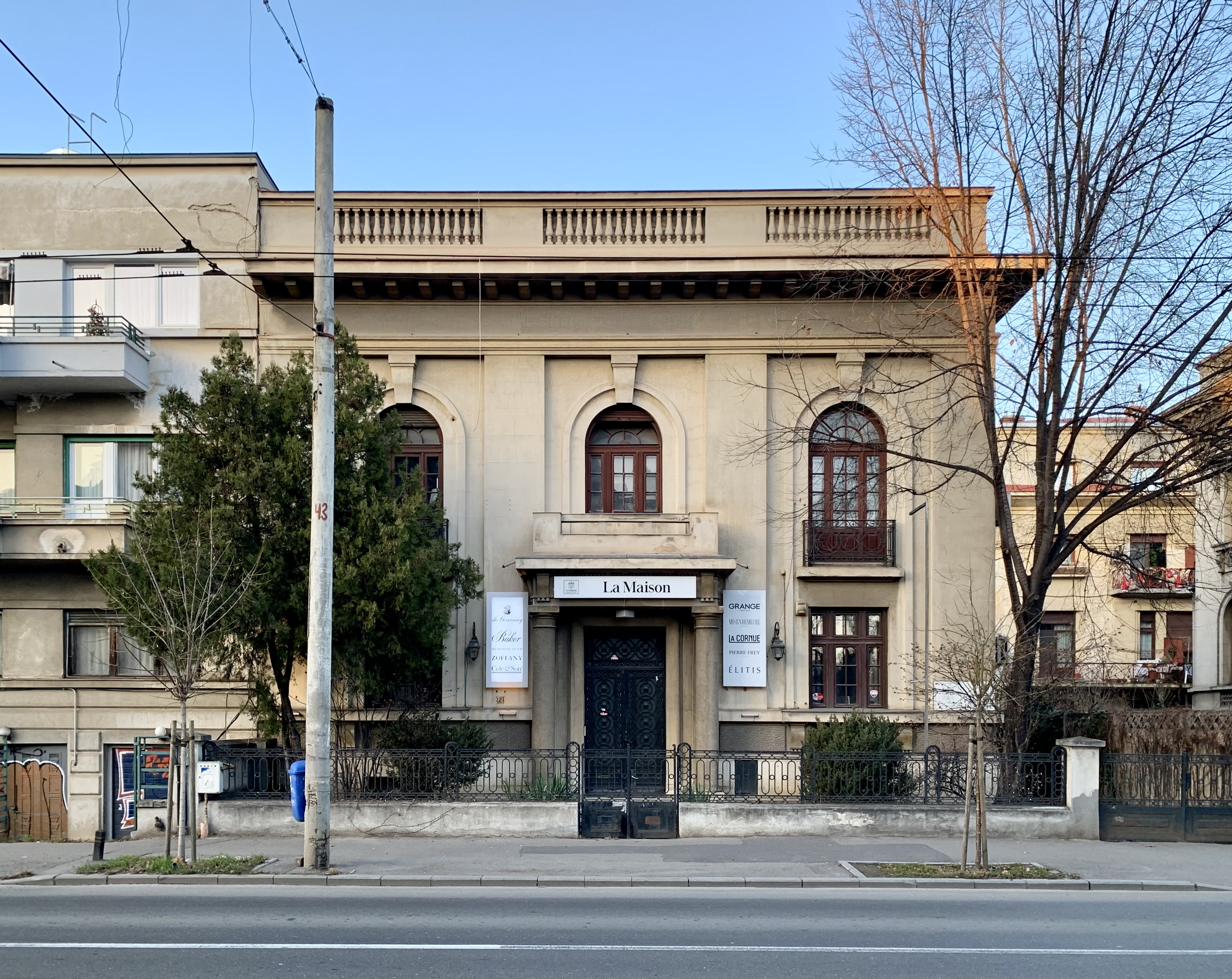
Dumitru Săvulescu House (Bulevardul Dacia no. 73), Bucharest, Romania, by Gheorghe Negoescu, 1933

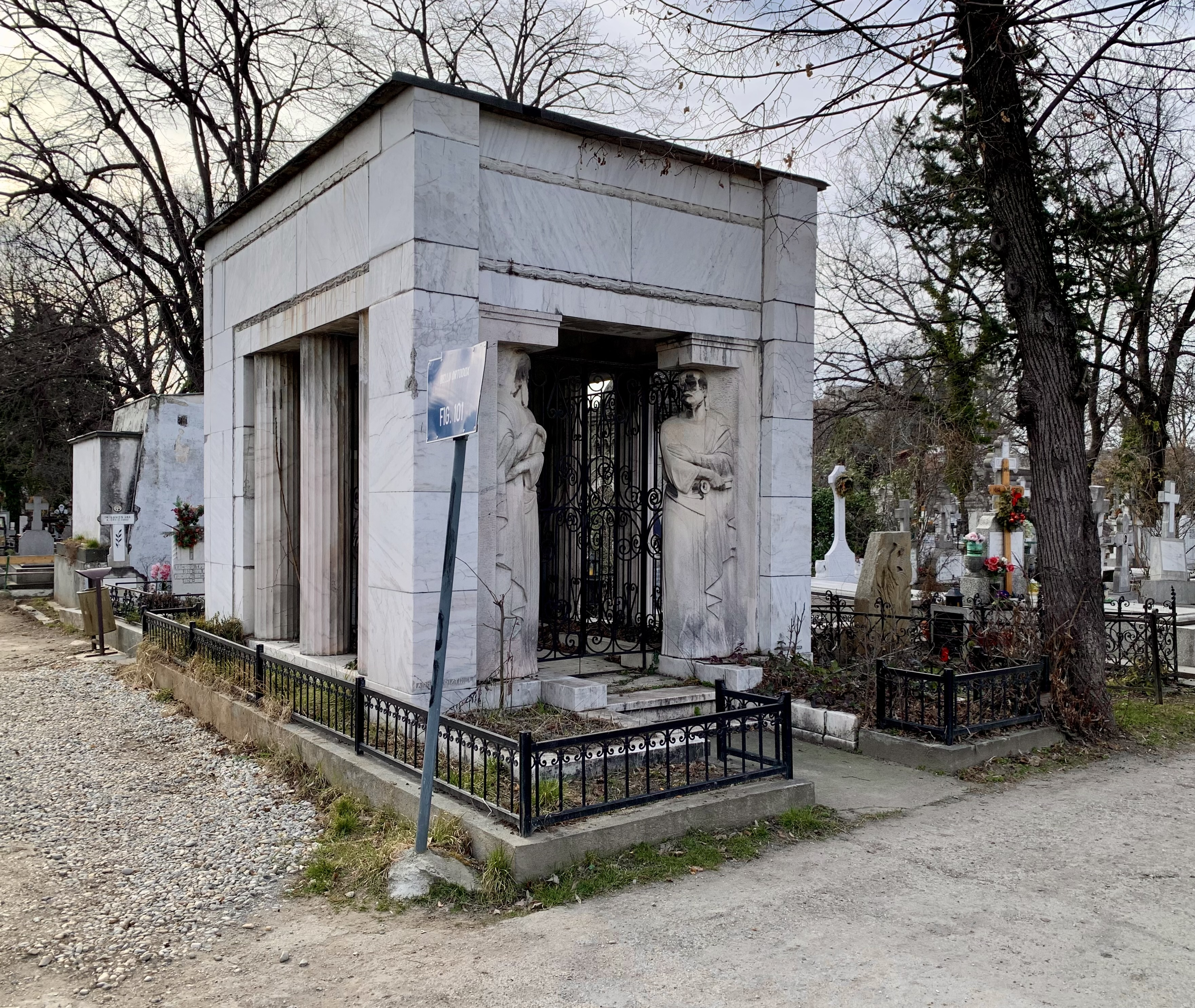
Grave of the Străjescu Family, Bellu Cemetery, Bucharest, by George Cristinel, 1934

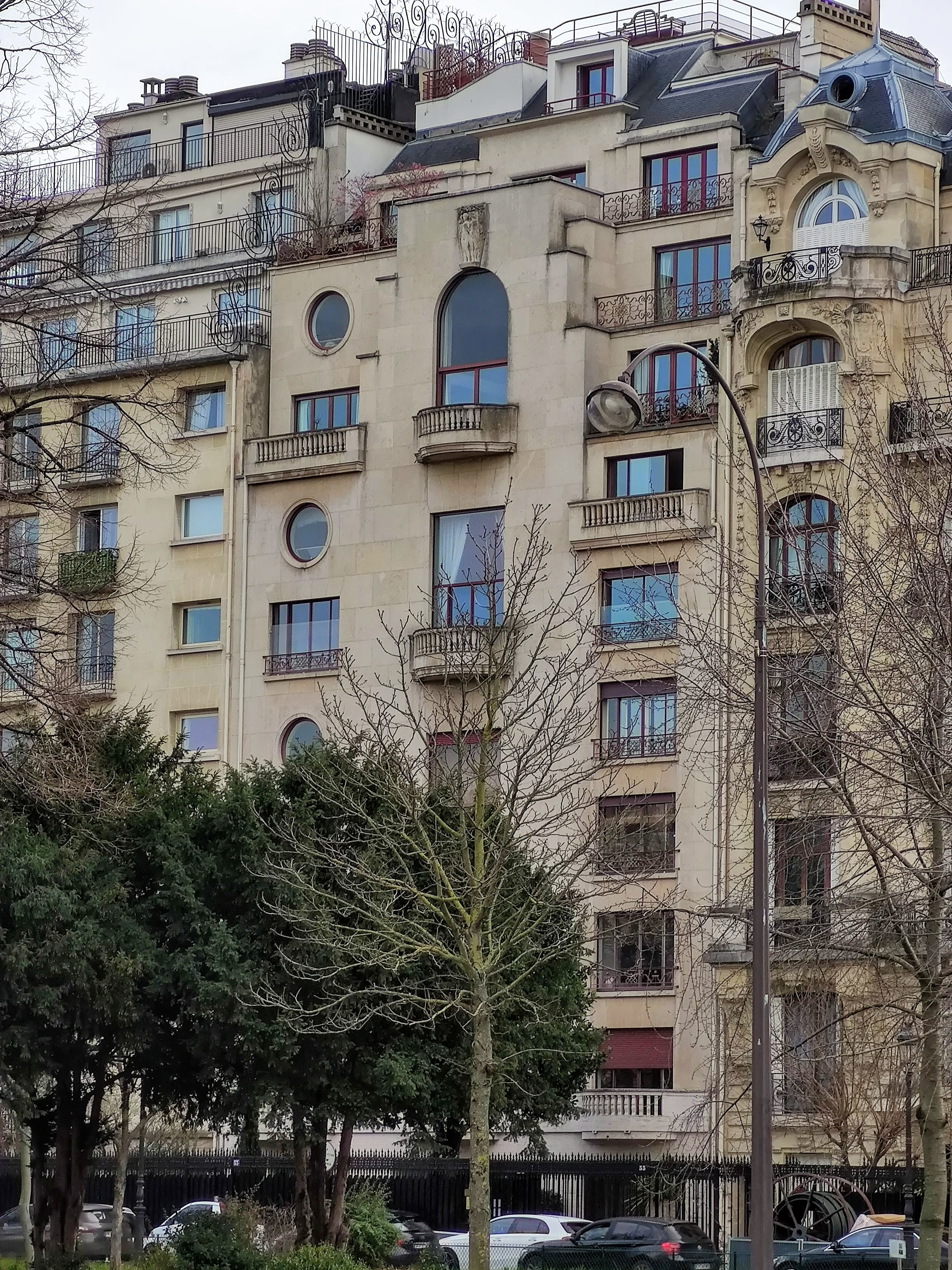
Avenue Foch no. 53, Paris, by Charles Abella, 1939

Although it started to be seen as 'dated' after WW1, principles, proportions and other Neoclassical elements were not abandoned yet. Art Deco was the dominant style during the interwar period, and it corresponds with the taste of a bourgeois elite for high class French styles of the past, including the Louis XVI, Directoire and Empire (the period styles of French Neoclassicism). At the same time, the French elite was equally capable of appreciating Modern art, like the works of Pablo Picasso or Amedeo Modigliani. The result of this situation is the early Art Deco style, which uses both new and old elements. The Palais de Tokyo from 1937 in Paris, by André Aubert and Marcel Dastugue, is a good example of this. Although ornaments are not used here, the facade being decorated only with reliefs, the way columns are present here is a strong reminiscence of Neoclassicism. Art Deco design often drew on Neoclassical motifs without expressing them overtly: severe, blocky commodes by Émile-Jacques Ruhlmann or Louis Süe & André Mare; crisp, extremely low-relief friezes of damsels and gazelles in every medium; fashionable dresses that were draped or cut on the bias to recreate Grecian lines; the art dance of Isadora Duncan. Conservative modernist architects such as Auguste Perret in France kept the rhythms and spacing of columnar architecture even in factory buildings.

The oscillation of Art Deco between the use of historic elements, shapes and proportions, and the appetite for 'new', for Modernism, is the result of multiple factors. One of them is eclecticism. The complexity and heterogeneity of Art Deco is largely due to the eclectic spirit. Stylized elements from repertoire of Beaux-Arts, Neoclassicism, or of cultures distant in time and space (Ancient Egypt, Pre-Columbian Americas, or Sub-Saharian African art) are put together with references to Modernist avant-guard artists of the early 20th century (Henri Matisse, Amedeo Modigliani or Constantin Brâncuși). The Art Deco phenomenon owes to academic eclecticism and Neoclassicism mainly the existence of a specific architecture. Without the contribution of the Beaux-Arts trained architects, Art Deco architecture would have remained, with the exception of residential buildings, a collection of decorative objects magnified to an urban scale, like the pavilions of the International Exhibition of Modern Decorative and Industrial Arts from 1925, controversial at their time. Another reason for the swinging between historical elements and modernism was consumer culture. Objects and buildings in the puritan International style, devoid of any ornamentation or citation of the past, were too radical for the general public. In interwar France and England, the spirit of the public and much architectural criticism could not conceive a style totally deprived of ornament, like the International style.

The use of historic styles as sources of inspiration for Art Deco starts as far back as the years before WW1, through the efforts of decorators like Maurice Dufrêne, Paul Follot, Paul Iribe, André Groult, Léon Jallot or Émile-Jacques Ruhlmann, who relate to the prestigious French artistic and handicraft tradition of the late 18th and early 19th centuries (the Louis XVI, Directoire and Louis Philippe), and who want to bring a new approach to these styles. The neo-Louis XVI style was really popular in France and Romania in the years before WW1, around 1910, and it heavily influenced multiple early Art Deco designs and buildings. A good example of this is the Château de Sept-Saulx in Grand Est, France, by Louis Süe, 1928–1929.

=== Neoclassicism and totalitarian regimes ===
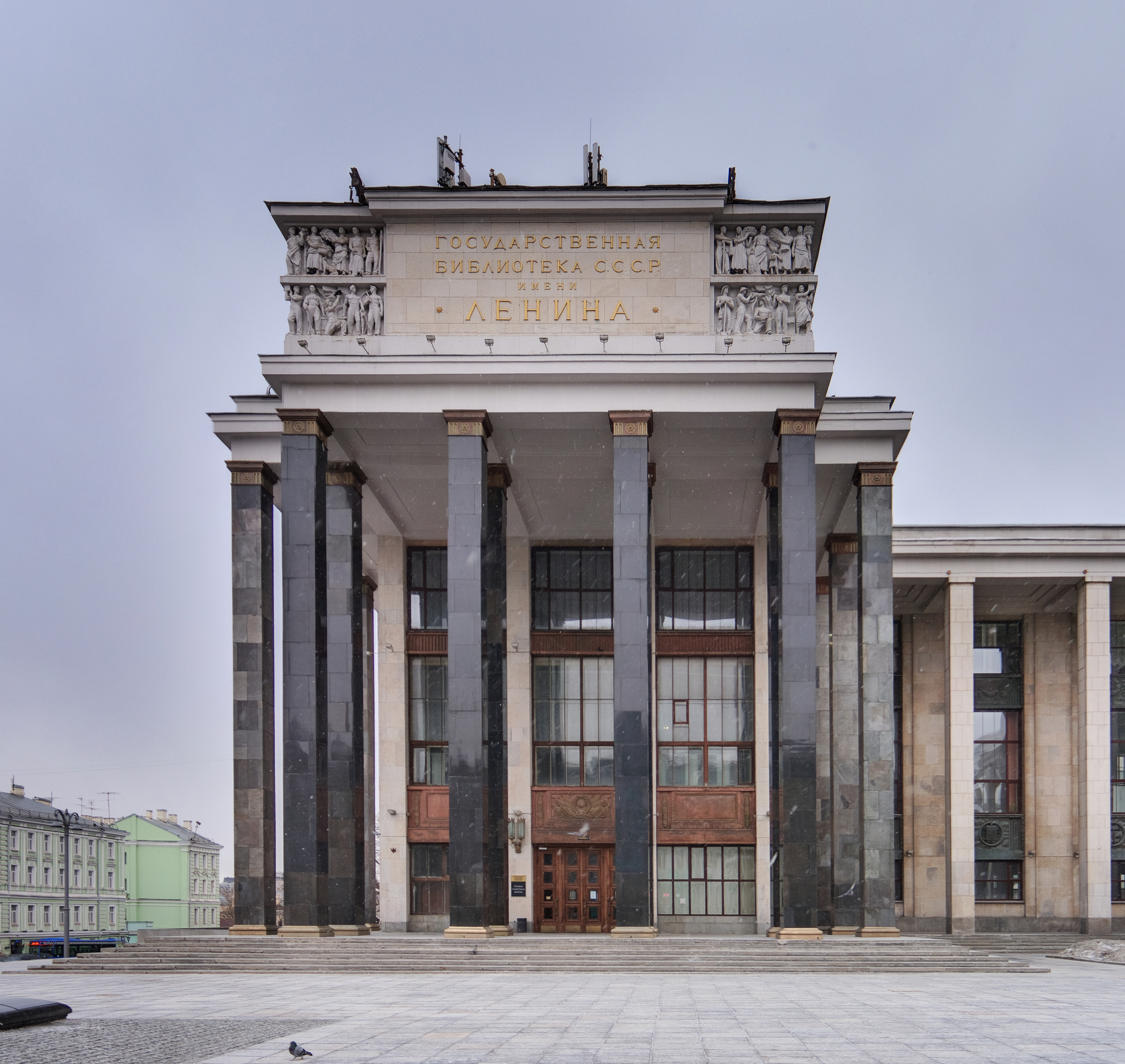
Socialist realist - Lenin State Library, Moscow, Russia, by Vladimir Shchuko and Vladimir Helfreich, 1928-1941

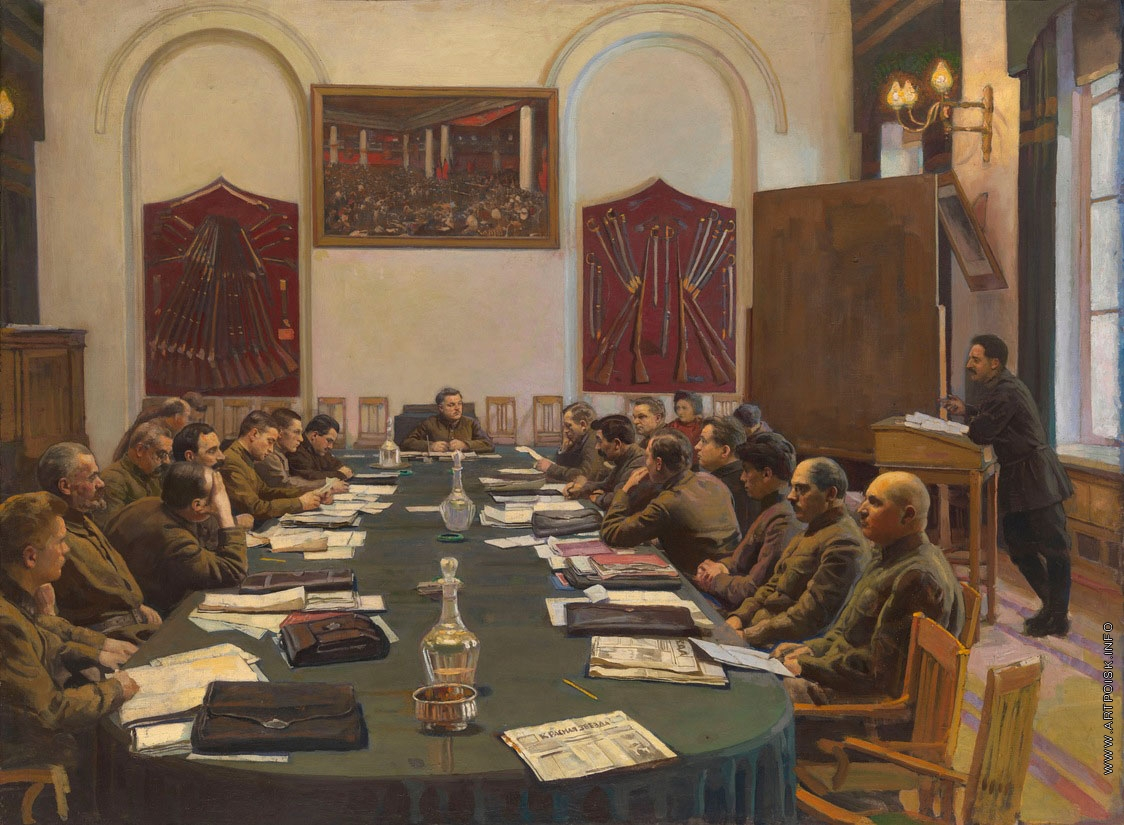
Socialist realist - Assembly of the Revolutionary Military Council of the USSR, Chaired by Kliment Voroshilov; by Isaak Brodsky; 1929; oil on canvas; 95.5 x 129.5 cm; private collection

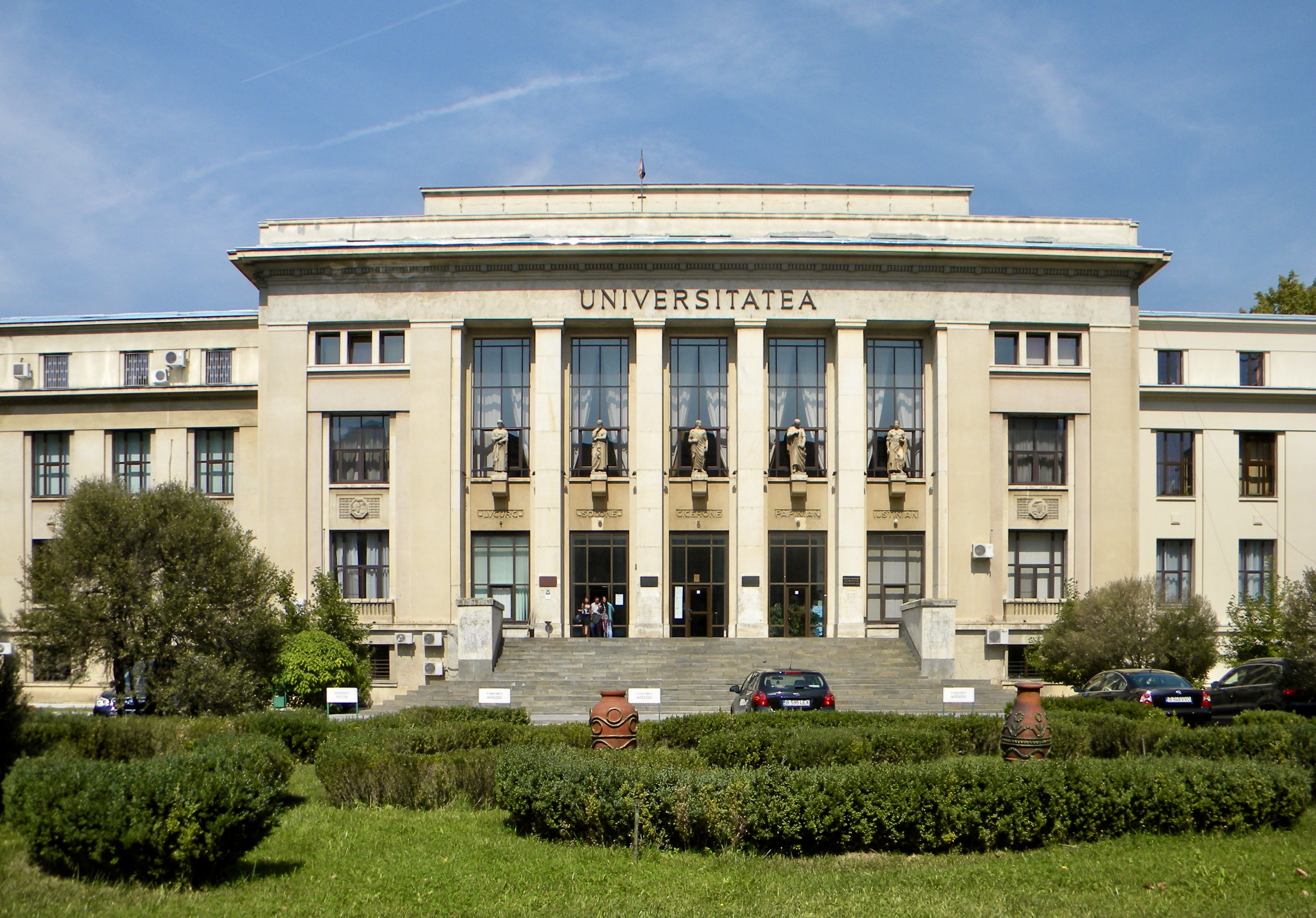
Fascist - University Rectorate and Law Faculty Building in Bucharest (Bulevardul Mihail Kogălniceanu no. 36–46), Bucharest, Romania, by Petre Antonescu, 1933-1935

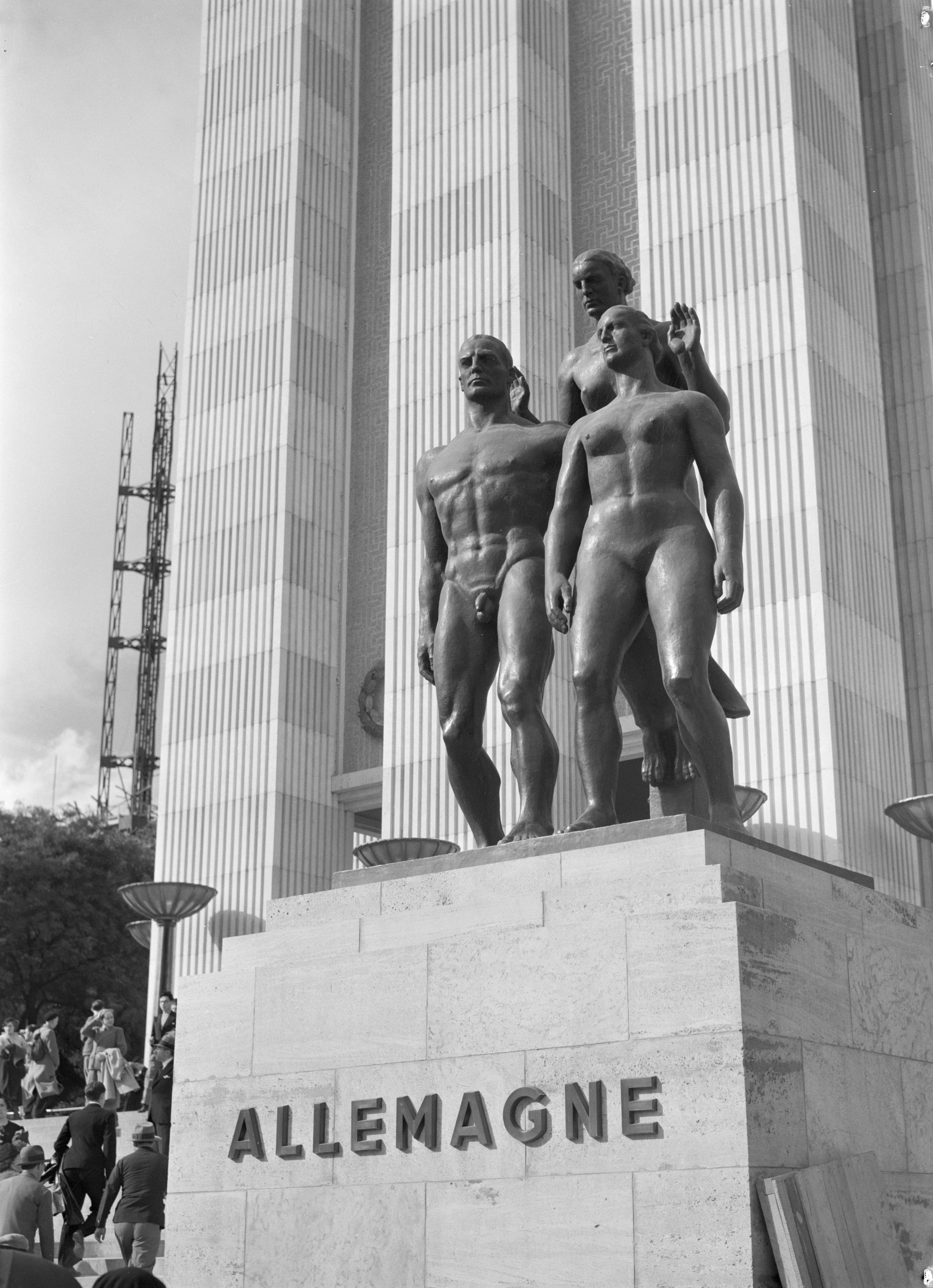
Nazi - Familie (The Family); by Josef Thorak; c.1937; probably bronze; unknown dimensions; exhibited at the 1937 Paris World Fair

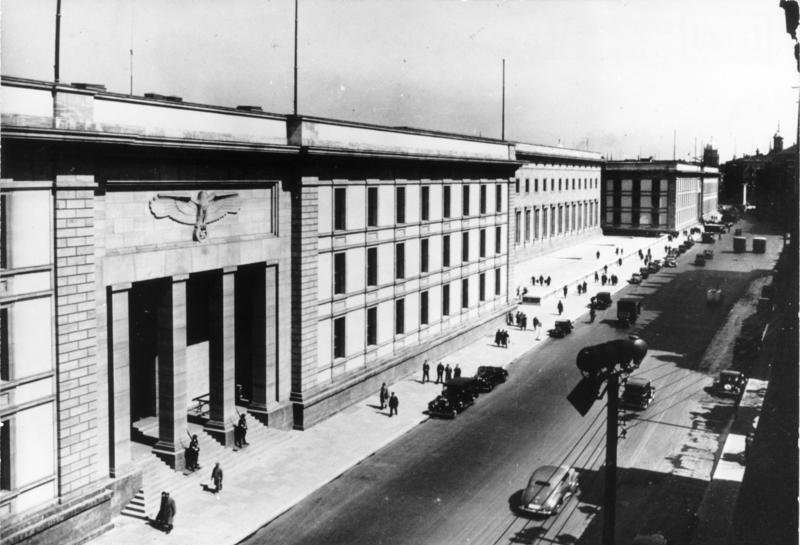
Nazi - New Reich Chancellery, Berlin, by Albert Speer, 1938-1939

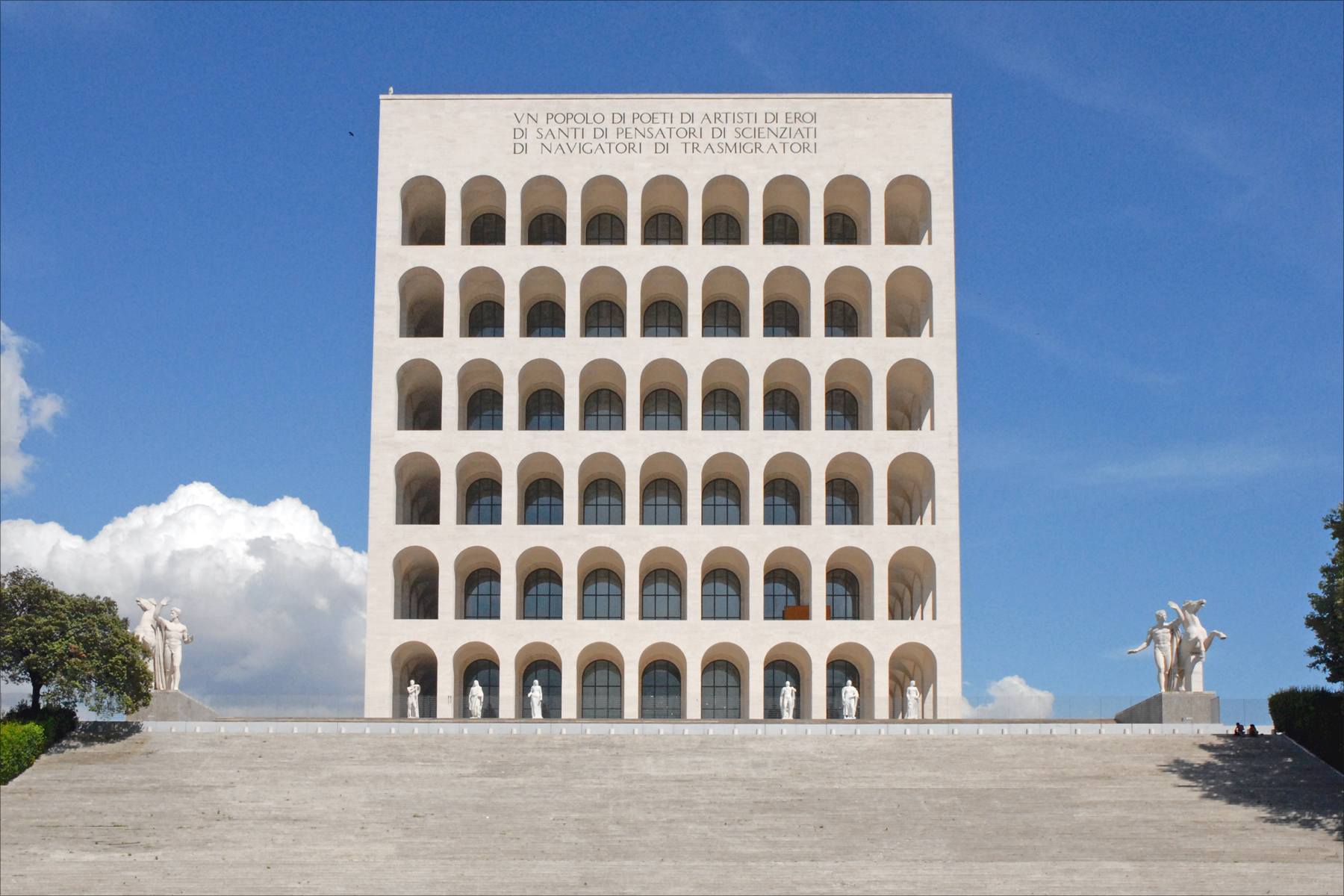
Fascist - Palazzo della Civiltà Italiana, Rome, by Giovanni Guerrini, Ernesto Lapadula, and Mario Romano, 1939-1942

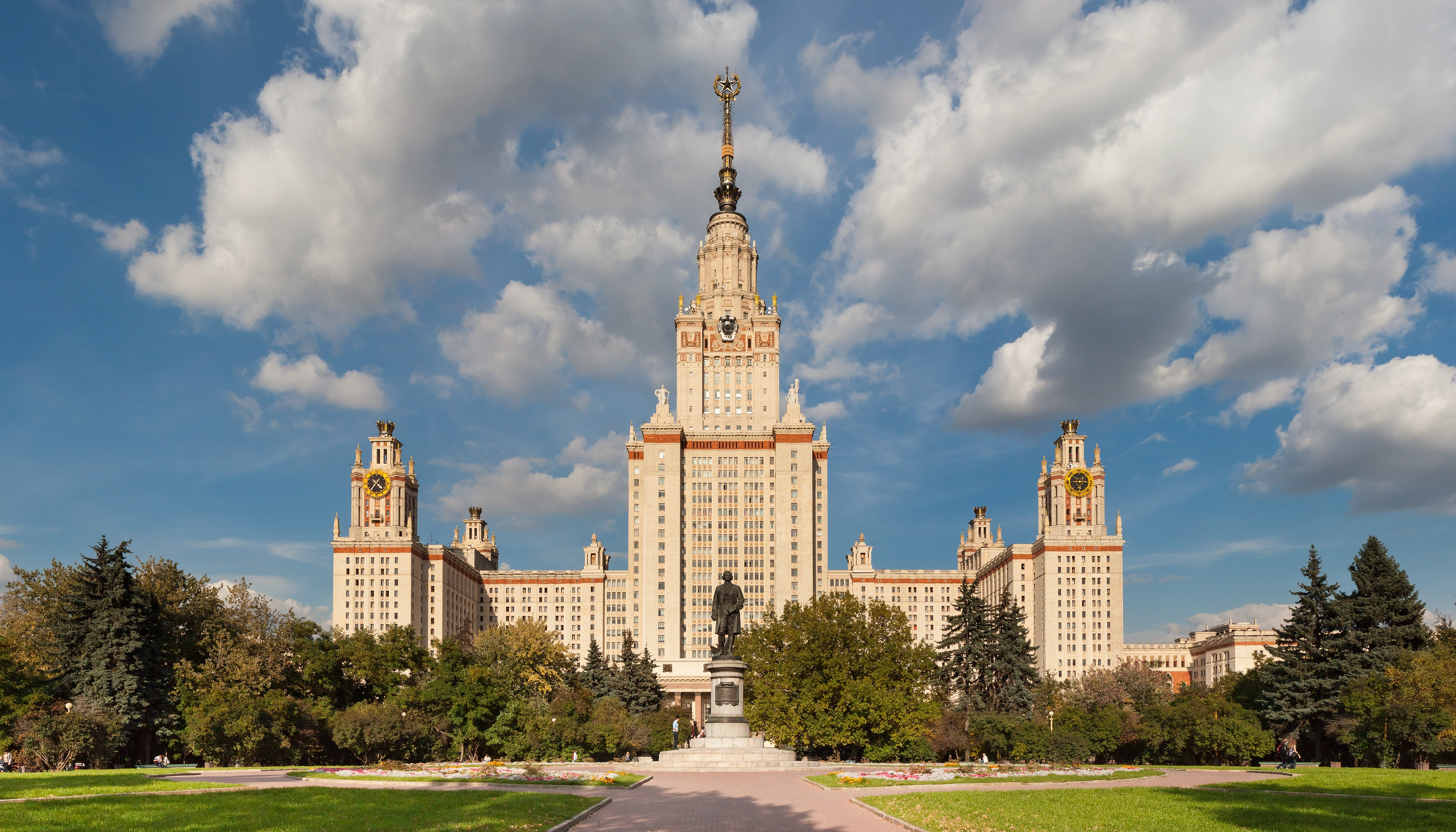
Socialist realist - Lomonosov University, Moscow, by Lev Rudnev, 1947-1952

Socialist realist - Colonels' Quarter (Șoseaua Panduri no. 60–62), Bucharest, by I.Novițchi, C.Ionescu, C.Hacker and A.Șerbescu, 1950–1960

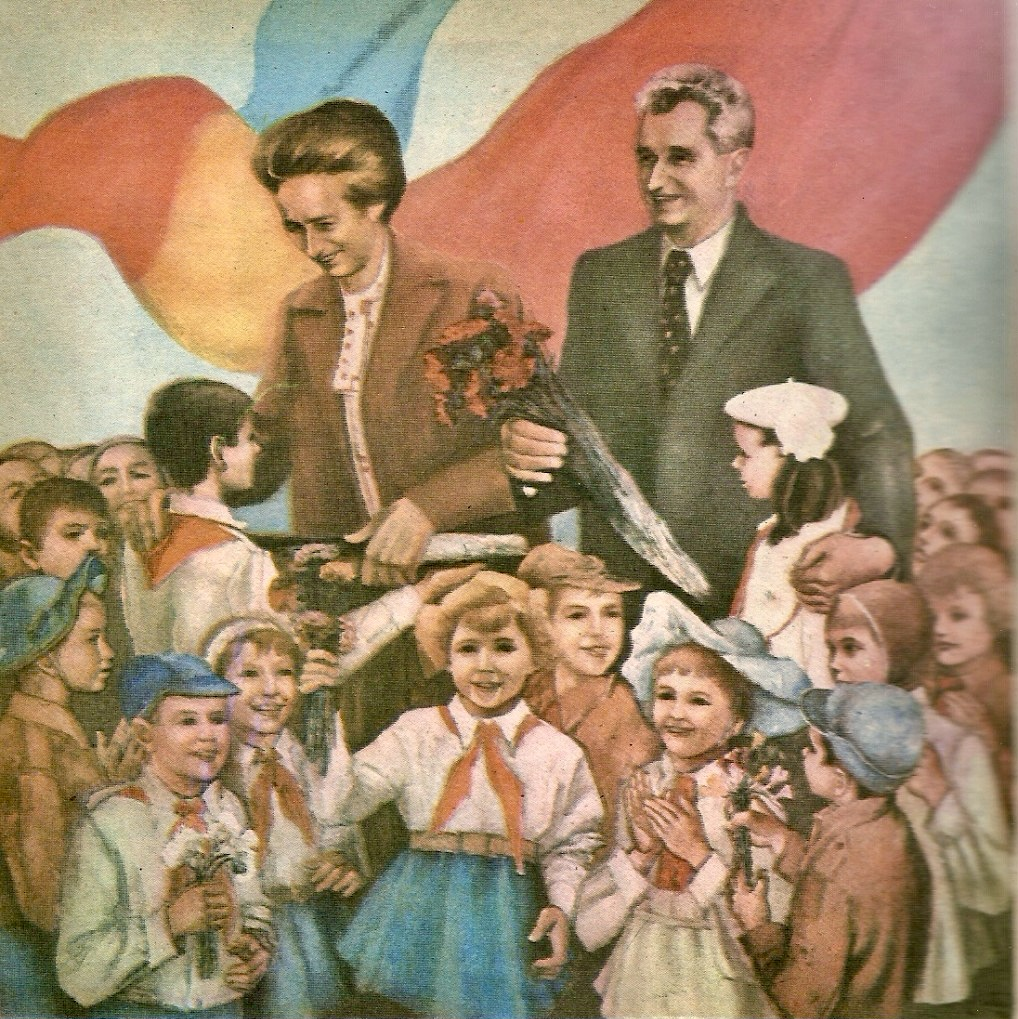
Socialist realist - Homage; by Constantin Nitescu; c.1980; unknown technique; unknown dimensions; Romania

In Fascist Italy, Nazi Germany, Romania under the rule of Carol II and the Soviet Union, during the 1920s and 1930s, totalitarian regimes chose Neoclassicism for state buildings and art. Architecture was central to totalitarian regimes' expression of their permanence (despite their obvious novelty). The way totalitarian regimes drew from Classicism took many forms. When it comes to state buildings in Italy and Romania, architects attempted to fuse a modern sensibility with abstract classical forms. Two good examples of this are the Palazzo della Civiltà Italiana in Rome, and the University Rectorate and Law Faculty Building in Bucharest (Bulevardul Mihail Kogălniceanu no. 36–46). In contrast, the Classicism of the Soviet Union, known as socialist realism, was bombastic, overloaded with ornaments and architectural sculptures, as an attempt to be in contrast with the simplicity of 'Capitalist' or 'bourgeois' styles like Art Deco or Modernism. The Lomonosov University in Moscow is a good example of this. Nikita Khrushchev, the Soviet leader that succeeded Stalin, did not like this pompous socialist realist architecture from the reign of his predecessor. Because of the low speed and cost of these Neoclassical buildings, he stated that 'they spent people's money on beauty that no one needs, instead of building simpler, but more'.

In the Soviet Union, Neoclassicism was embraced as a rejection of Art Deco and Modernism, which the Communists saw as being too 'bourgeois' and 'capitalist'. This Communist Neoclassical style is known as socialist realism, and it was popular during the reign of Joseph Stalin (1924–1953). In fine art. Generally, it manifested through deeply idealized representations of wiry workers, shown as heroes in collective farms or industrialized cities, political assemblies, achievements of Soviet technology, and through depictions happy children staying around Lenin or Stalin. Both subject matter and representation were carefully monitored. Artistic merit was determined by the degree to which a work contributed to the building of socialism. All artists had to join the state-controlled Union of Soviet Artists and produce work in the accepted style. The three guiding principles of socialist realism were party loyalty, presentation of correct ideology and accessibility. Realism, more easily understood by the masses, was the style of choice. At the beginning, in the Soviet Union, multiple competing avant-garde movements were present, notably Constructivism. However, as Stalin consolidated his power towards the end of the 1920s, avant-garde art and architecture were suppressed and eventually outlawed and official state styles were established. After Boris Iofan won the competition for the design of the Palace of the Soviets with a stepped classical tower, surmounted by a giant statue of Lenin, architecture soon reverted to pre-Revolutionary styles of art and architecture, untainted by Constructivism's perceived Western influence. Although socialist realism in architecture ended more or less with the death of Stalin and the rise of Nikita Khrushchev, paintings in this style continued to be produced, especially in countries where there was a strong personality cult of the leader in power, like in the case of Mao Zedong's China, Kim Il Sung's North Korea, or Nicolae Ceaușescu's Romania.

The Nazis suppressed Germany's vibrant avant-garde culture once they gained control of the government in 1933. Albert Speer was set as Adolf Hitler's architectural advisor in 1934, and he tried to create an architecture that would both reflect the perceived unity of the German people and act as backdrop to the Nazis' expressions of power. The Nazis' approach to architecture was riddled with contradictions: while Hitler and Speer's plans for reordering Berlin aspired to imitate imperial Rome, in rural contexts Nazi buildings took inspiration from local vernaculars, trying to channel an 'authentic' German spirit. When it come to fine art, the Nazis created the term 'Degenerate art' for Modern art, a kind of art which to them was 'un-German', 'Jewish' or 'Communist'. The Nazis hated modern art and linked it to 'Cultural Bolshevism', the conspiracy theory that art (or culture broadly) was controlled by a leftist Jewish cabal seeking to destroy the aryan race. Hitler's war on Modern art mostly consisted of an exhibition that tried to discredit Modern artists, called the 'Degenerate Art exhibition' (German: Die Ausstellung "Entartete Kunst"). This exhibition was displayed next to the Great Exhibition of German Art, which consisted of artworks that the Nazis approved of. This way, the visitors of both exhibitions could compare the art labeled by the regime as 'good' and 'bad'. With a similar attitude, the regime closed in 1931 the Bauhaus, an avant-garde art school in Dessau that was extremely influential post-war. It reopened in Berlin in 1932, but was closed again in 1933.

Compared to Germany and the Soviet Union, in Italy the avant-garde contributed to state architecture. Classical architecture was also an influence, echoing Benito Mussolini's far cruder attempts to create links between his Fascist regime and ancient Rome. Some Italian architects tried to create fusions between Modernism and Classicism, like Marcello Piacentini with the Sapienza University of Rome, or Giuseppe Terragni with Casa del Fascio in Como.

In Romania, towards the late 1930s, influenced by the Autocratic tendency of King Carol II, multiple state buildings were erected. They were Neoclassical, many very similar to what was popular in the same years in Fascist Italy. Examples in Bucharest include the University Rectorate and Law Faculty Building (Bulevardul Mihail Kogălniceanu no. 36–46), the Kretzulescu Apartment Building (Calea Victoriei no. 45), the CFR Building (Bulevardul Dinicu Golescu no. 38) or the Victoria Palace (Piața Victoriei no. 1). The Royal Palace, whose interiors are mostly done in a neo-Adam style, stands out by being more decorated, a little closer to the architecture before World War I.

=== Postmodernism ===
J. Paul Getty Museum, Malibu, California, US, by the partnership of Langdon and Wilson with Edward Genter as the project architect and archaeological advice from Dr Norman Neuerberg, 1970-1975

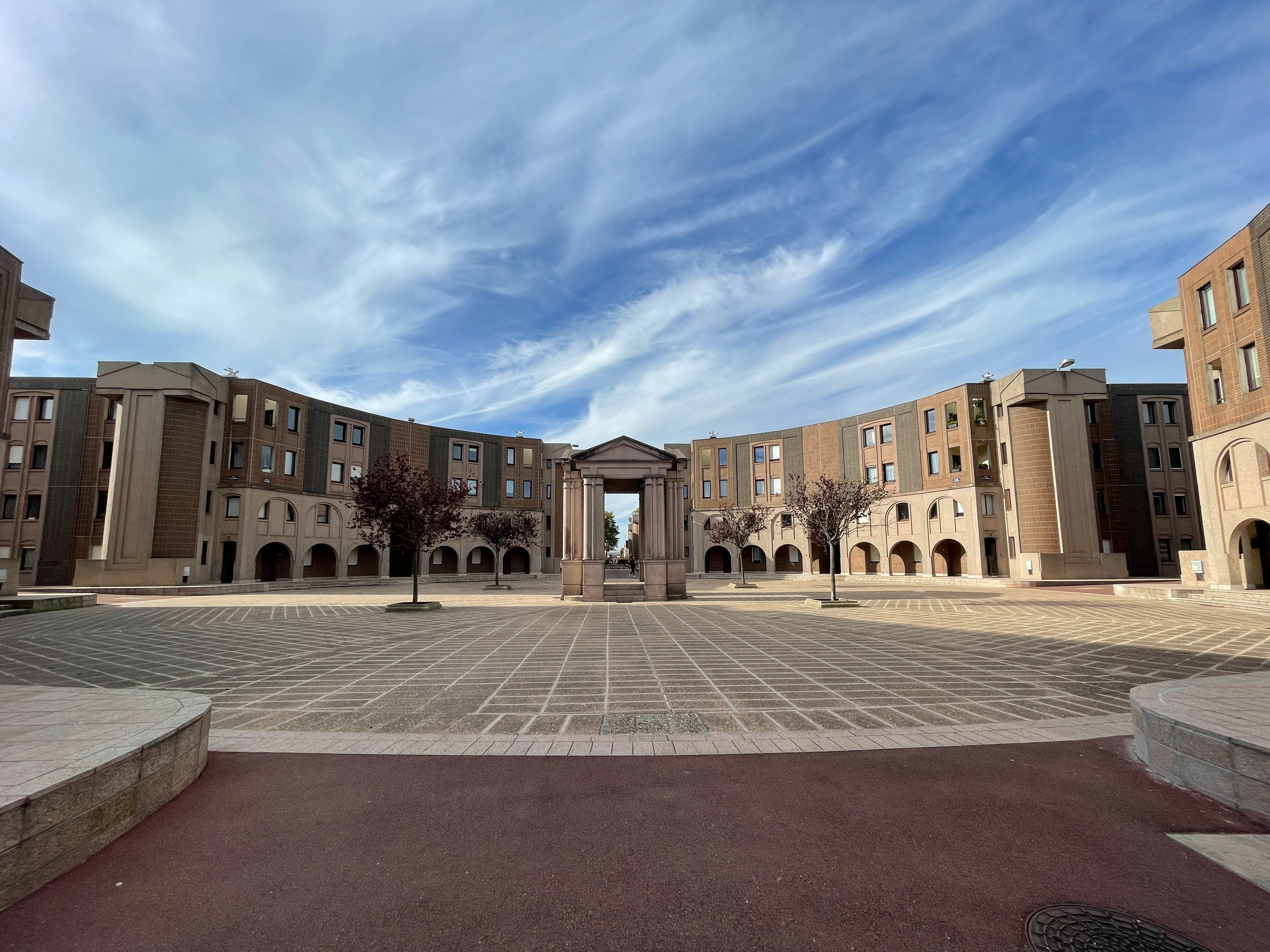
Interior courtyard of Les Arcades du Lac, Saint-Quentin-en-Yvelines, France, by Ricardo Bofill, 1975-1981

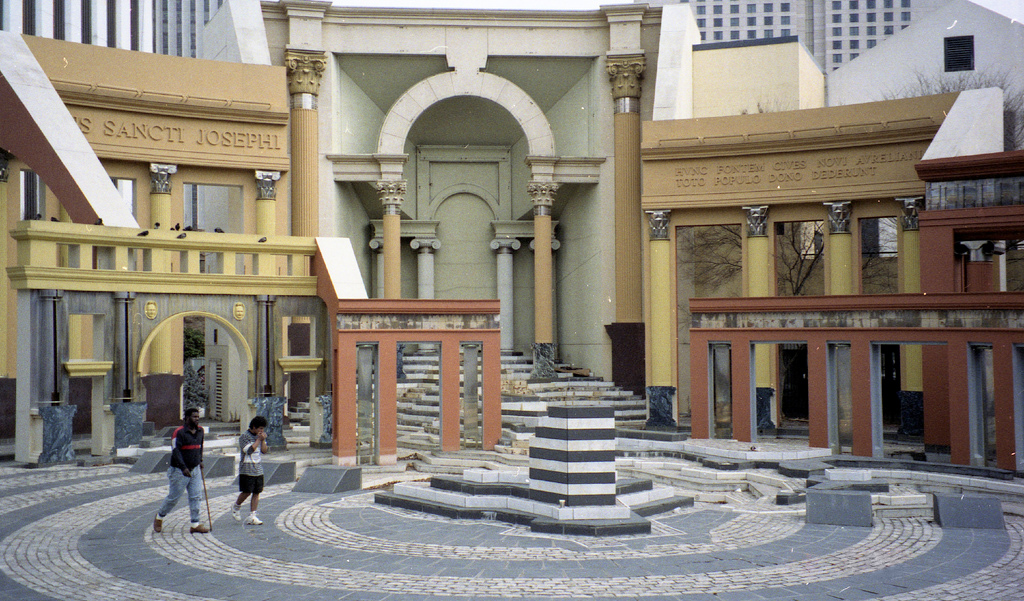
Piazza d'Italia (New Orleans), US, by Charles Moore, 1978

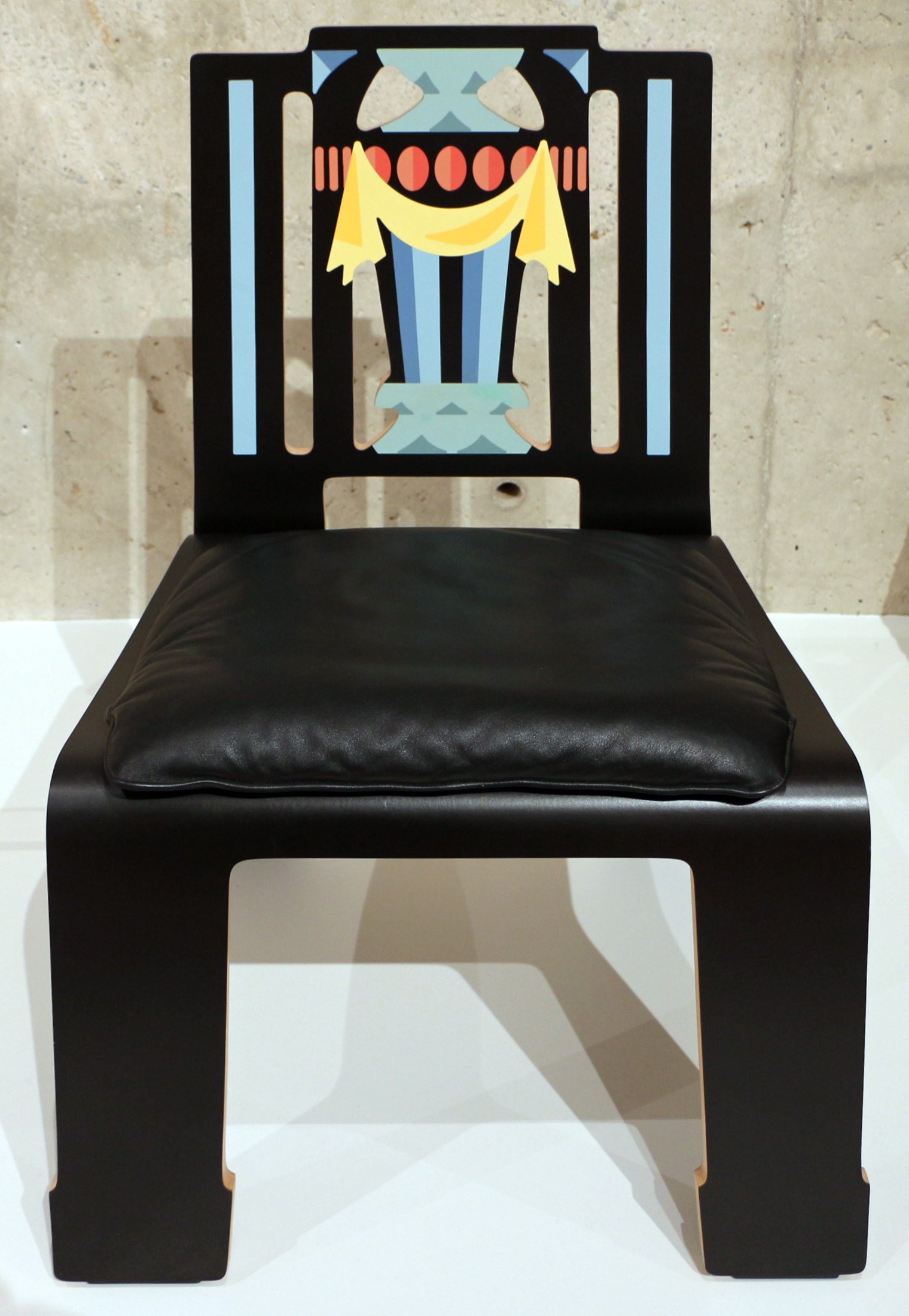
Sheraton chair with applied decoration; by Robert Venturi for Knoll; 1978–1984, bent laminated wood; unknown dimensions; Milwaukee Art Museum, Milwaukee, USA

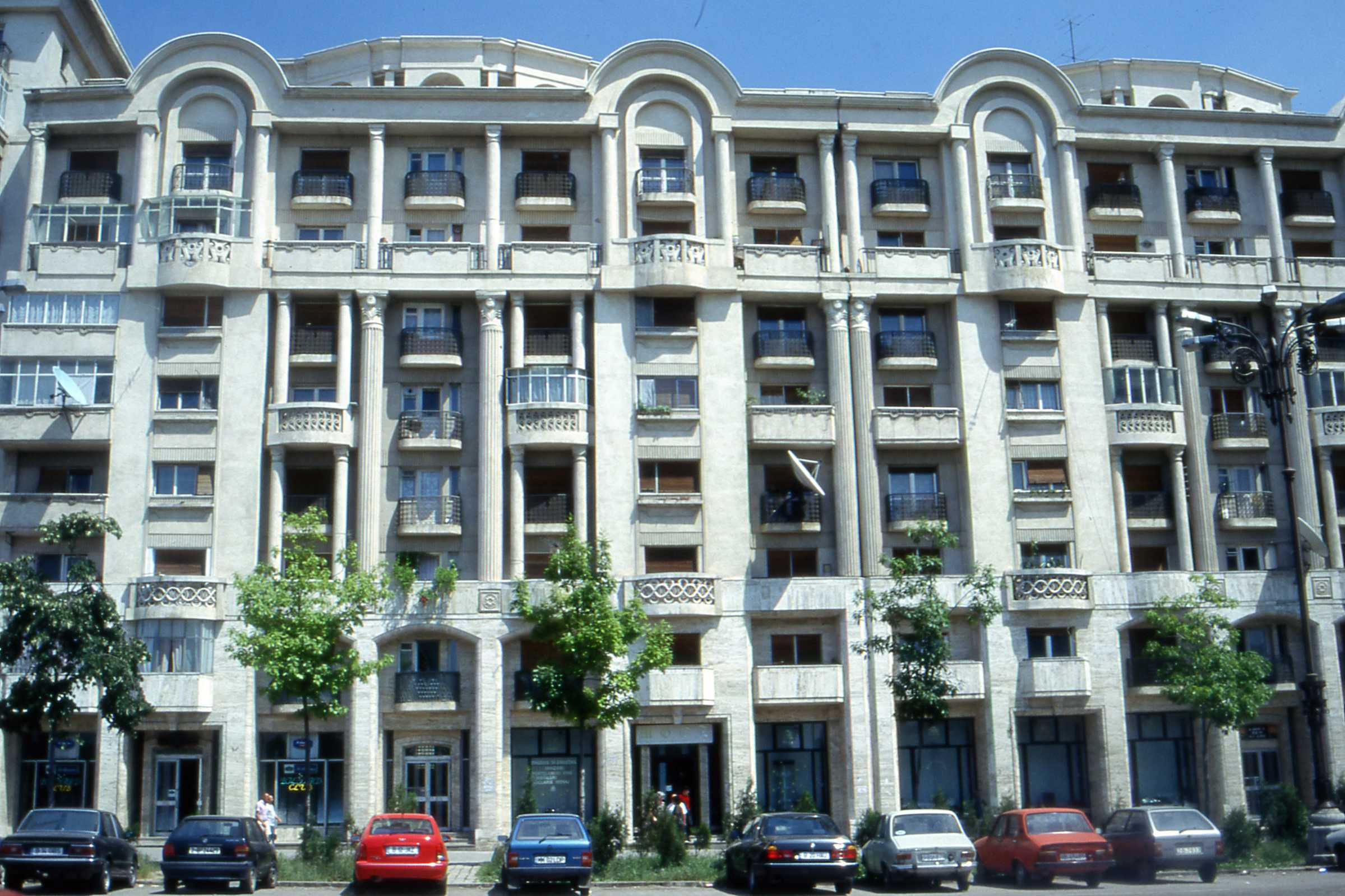
Apartment buildings on Bulevardul Unirii, Bucharest, Romania, unknown architects, 1980s

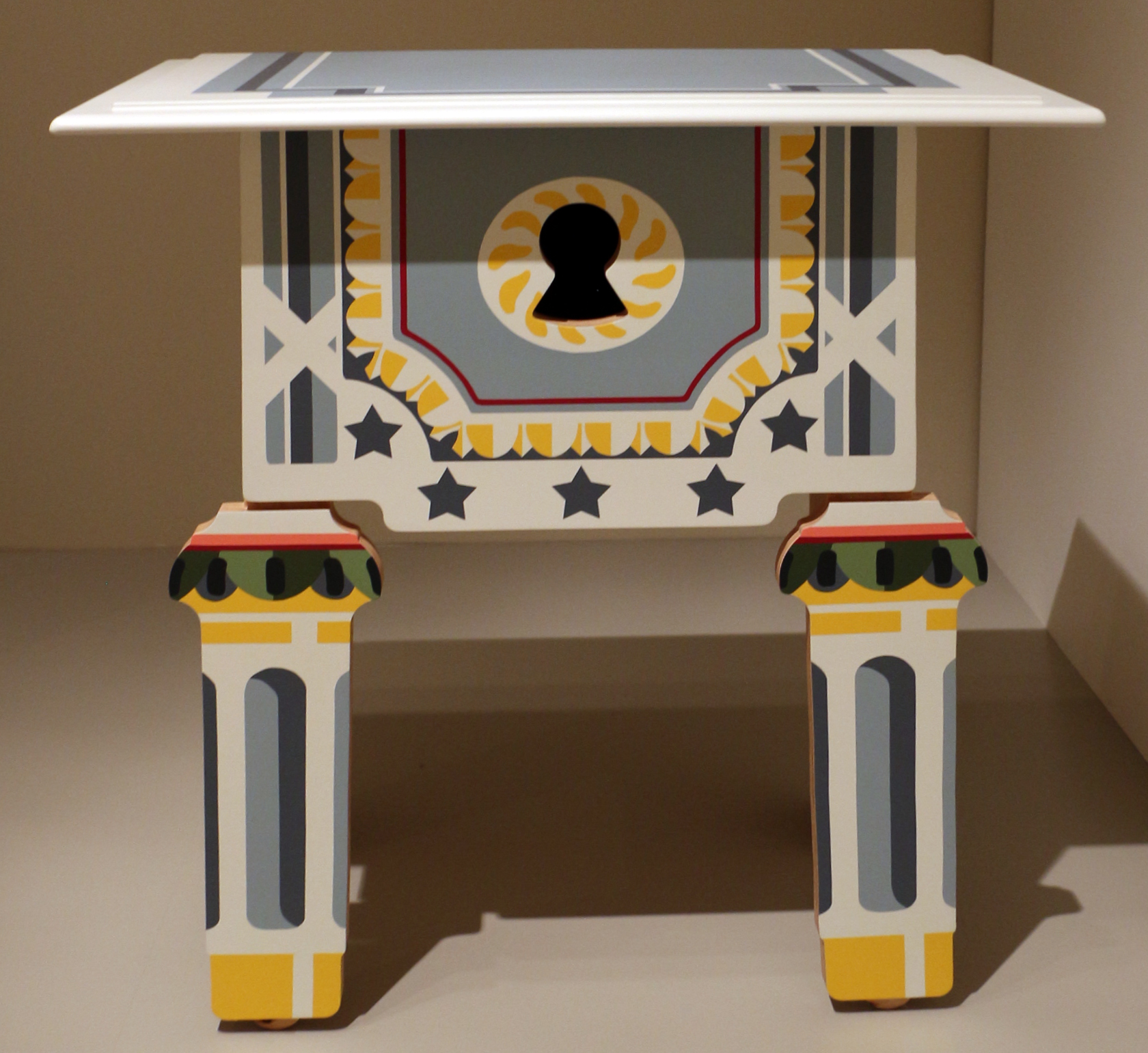
Louis XVI, lowboy; by Robert Venturi for Arc International; c.1985; laminated wood; unknown dimensions; Indianapolis Museum of Art, Indianapolis, USA

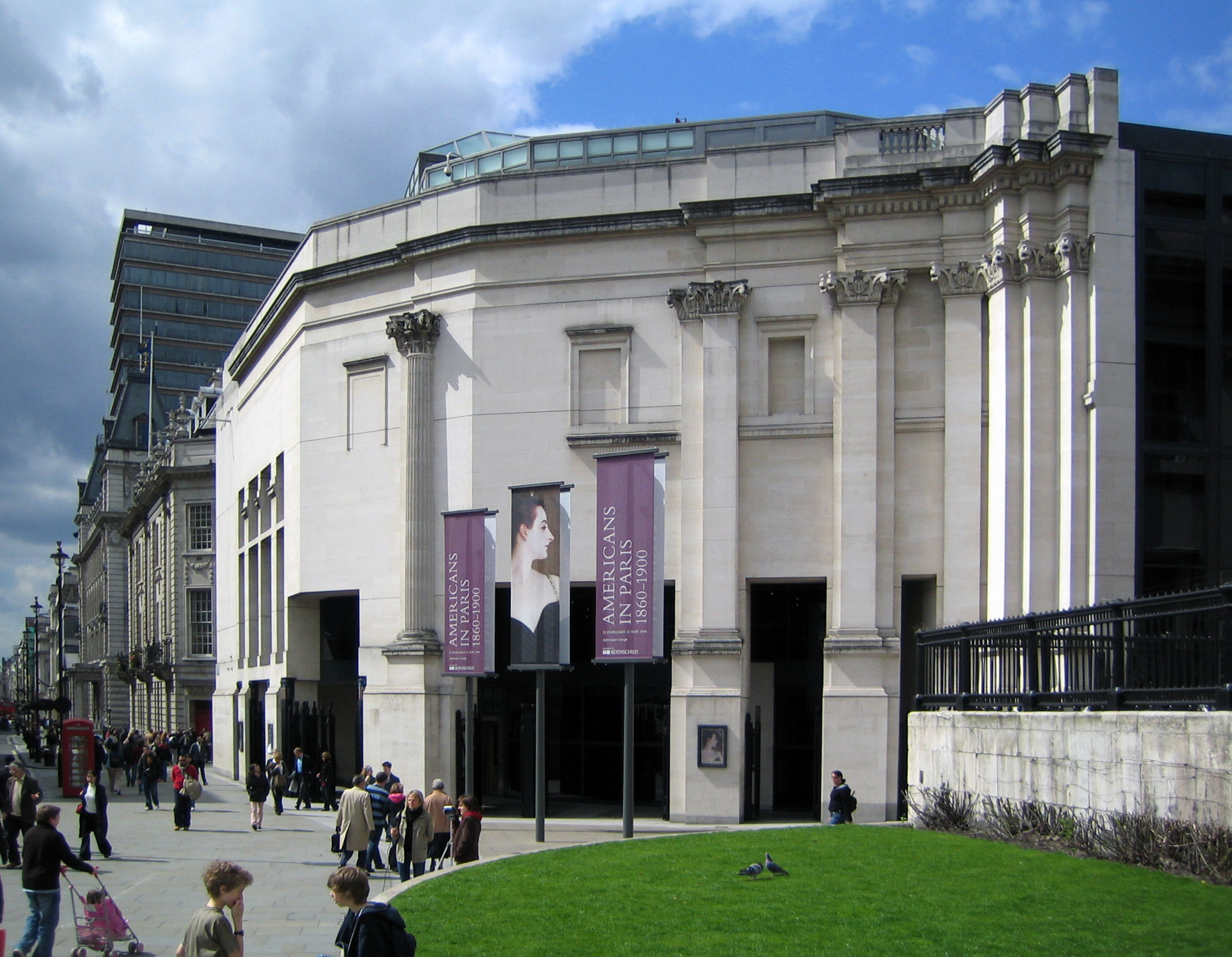
Sainsbury Wing, National Gallery, London, by Robert Venturi, 1987-1991

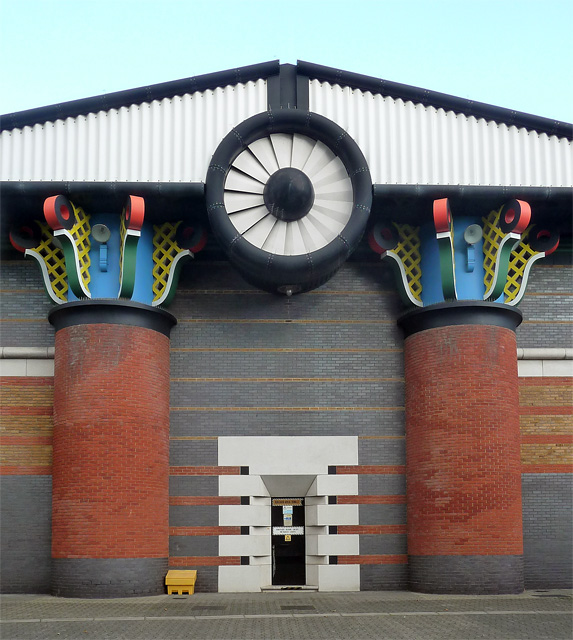
Isle of Dogs Pumping Station, London, John Outram, 1988

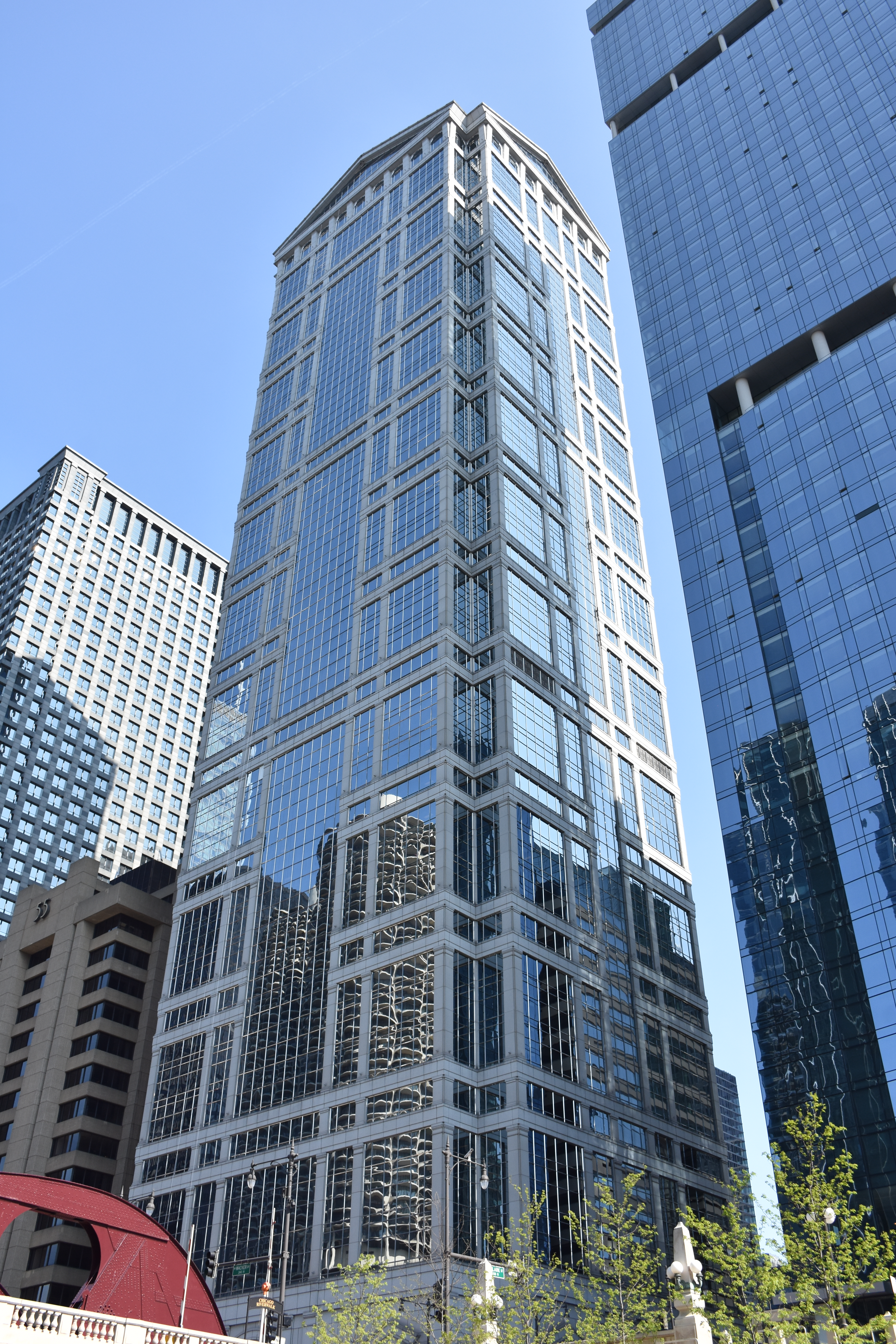
77 West Wacker Drive, Chicago, US, by Ricardo Bofill, 1990-1992

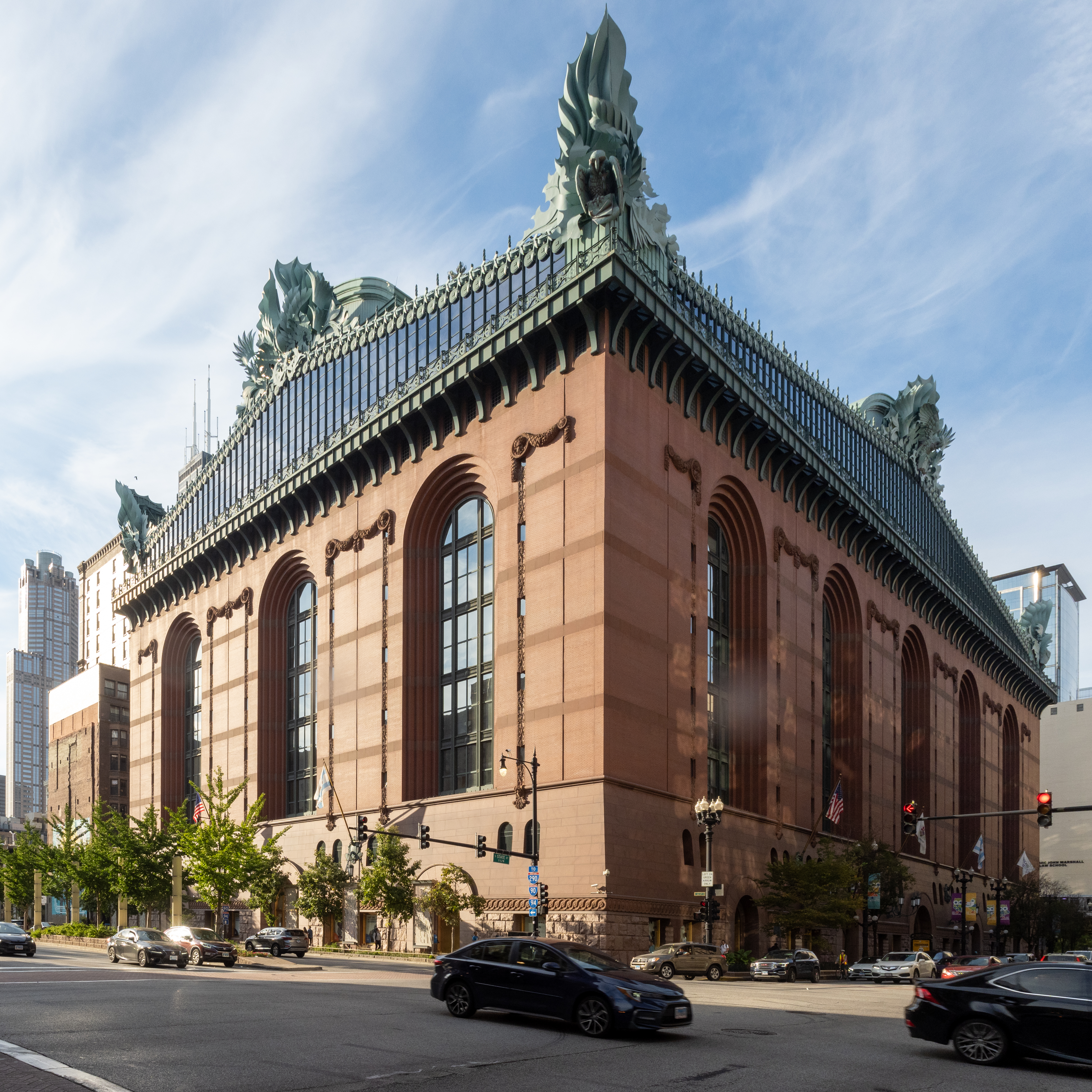
Harold Washington Library, Chicago, by Hammond, Beeby & Babka, 1991

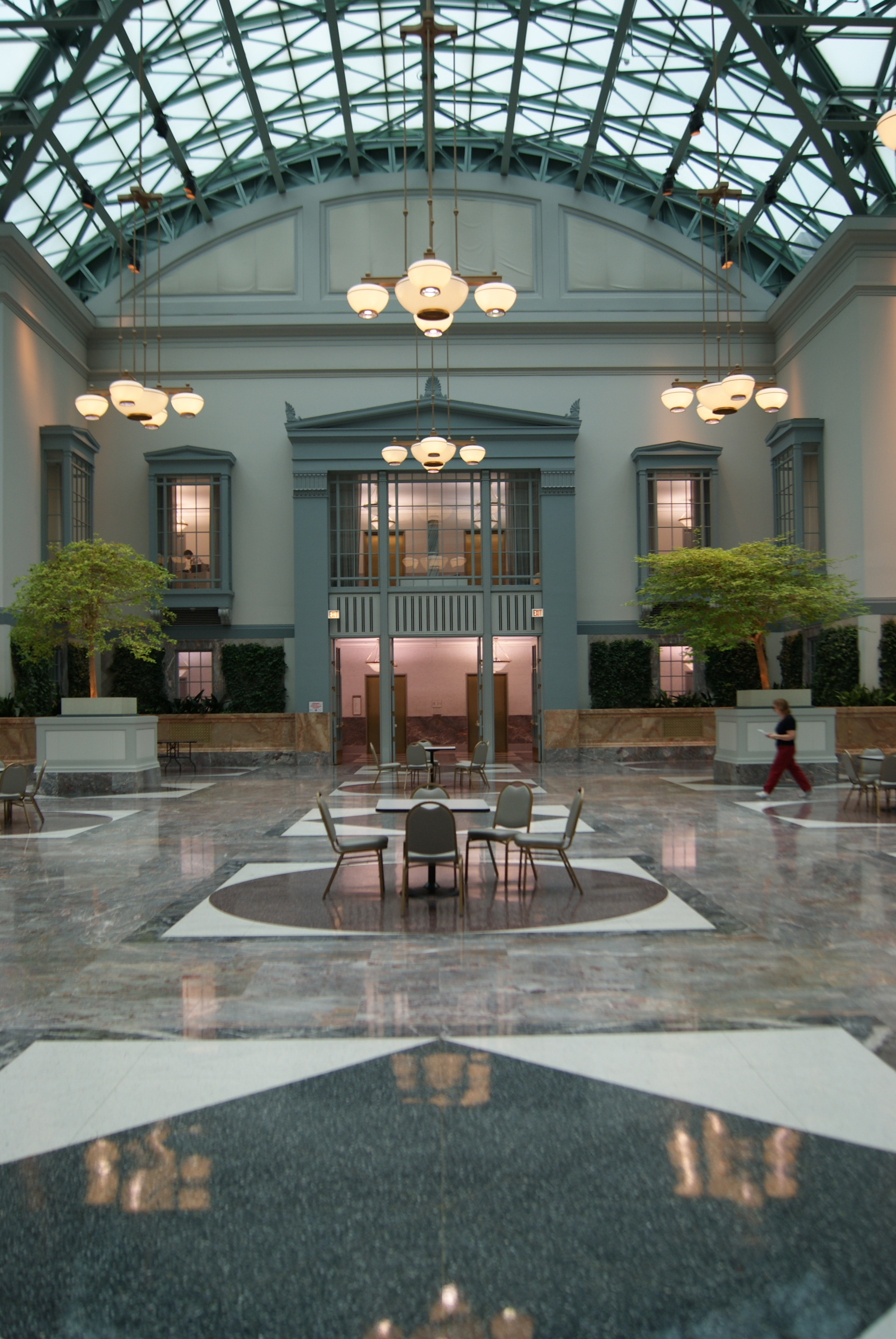
Winter garden of the Harold Washington Library, by Hammond, Beeby & Babka, 1991

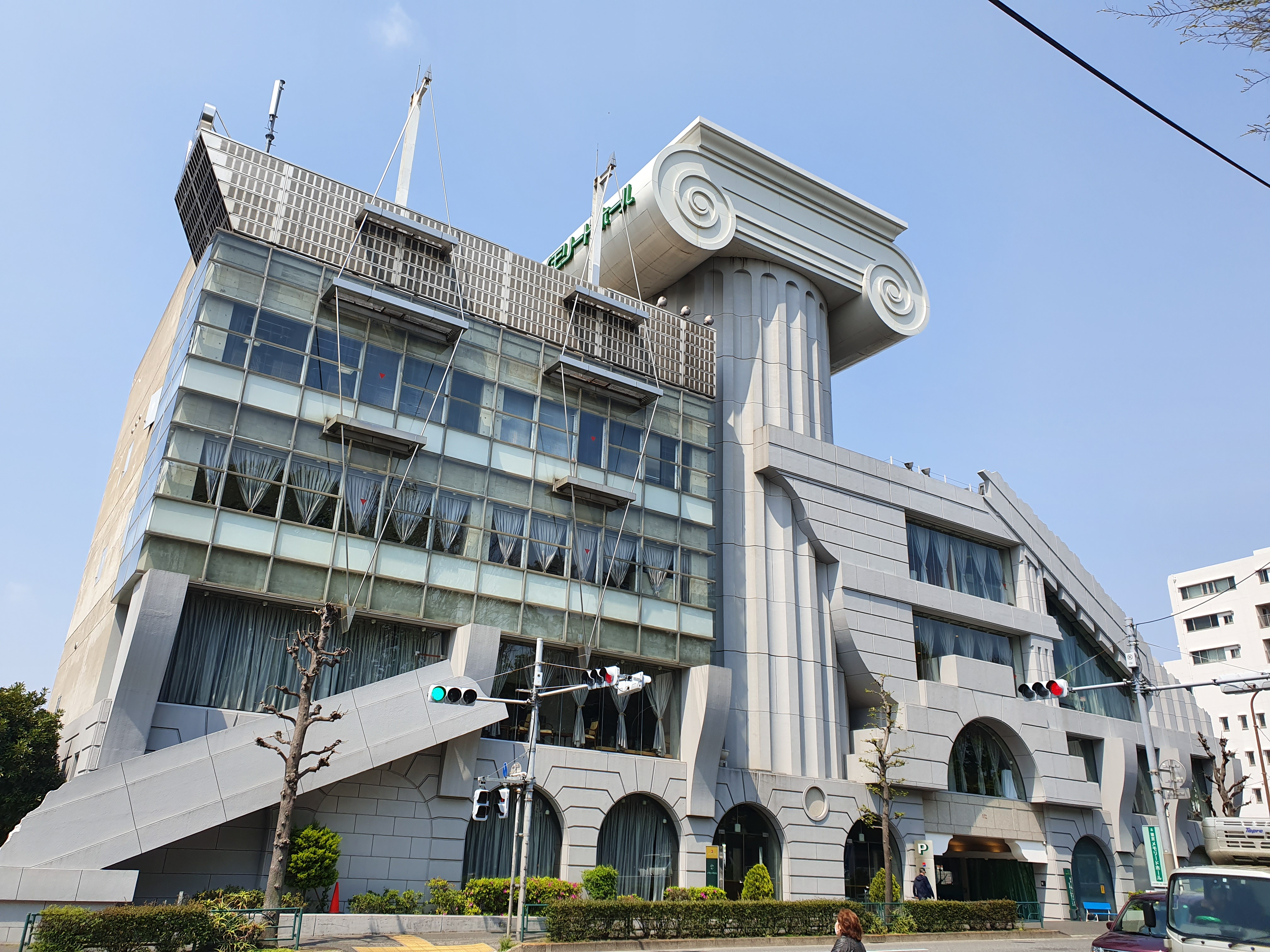
M2 Building, Tokyo, Japan, by Kengo Kuma, 1991

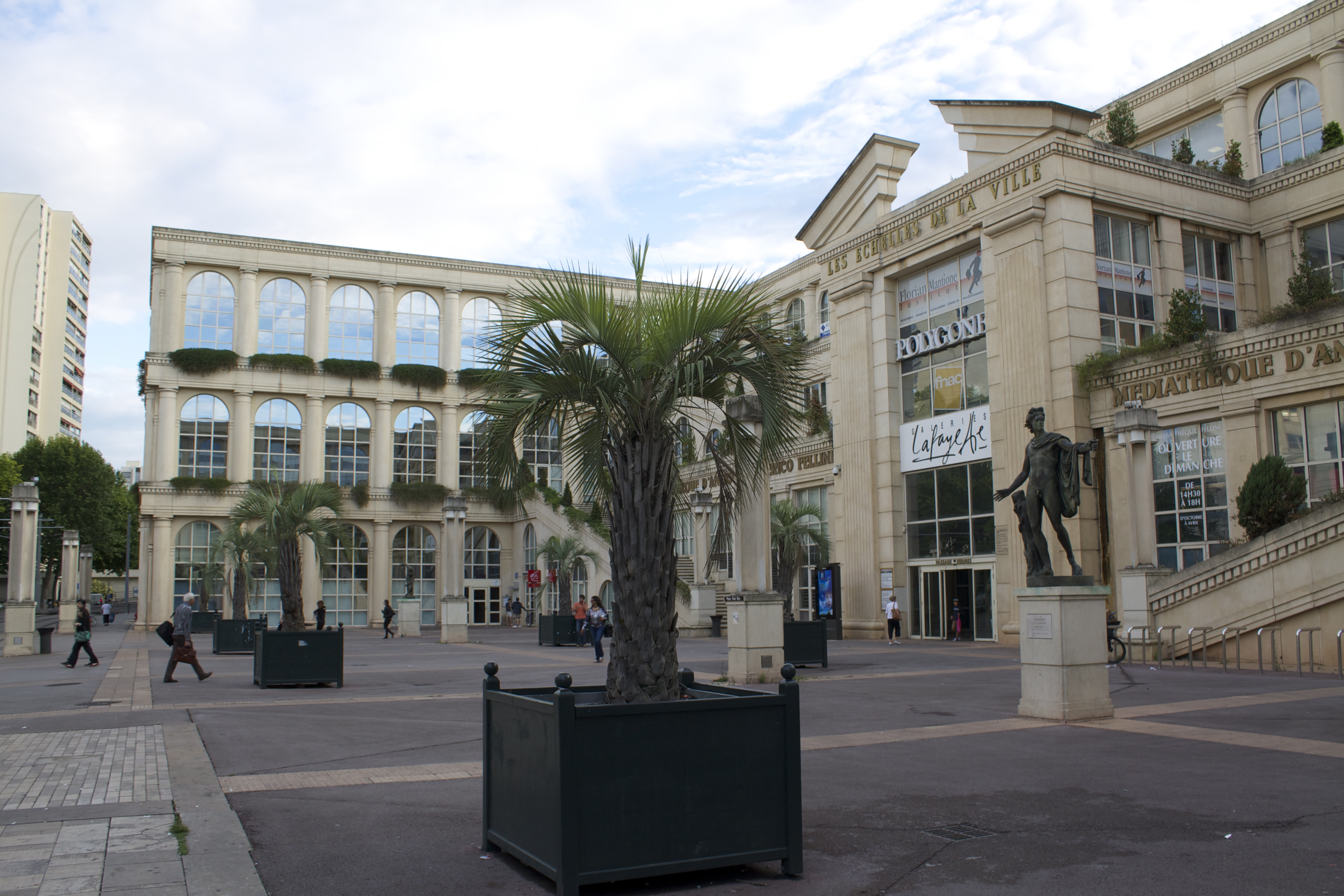
Antigone, Montpellier, France, by Ricardo Bofill, completed in 1992

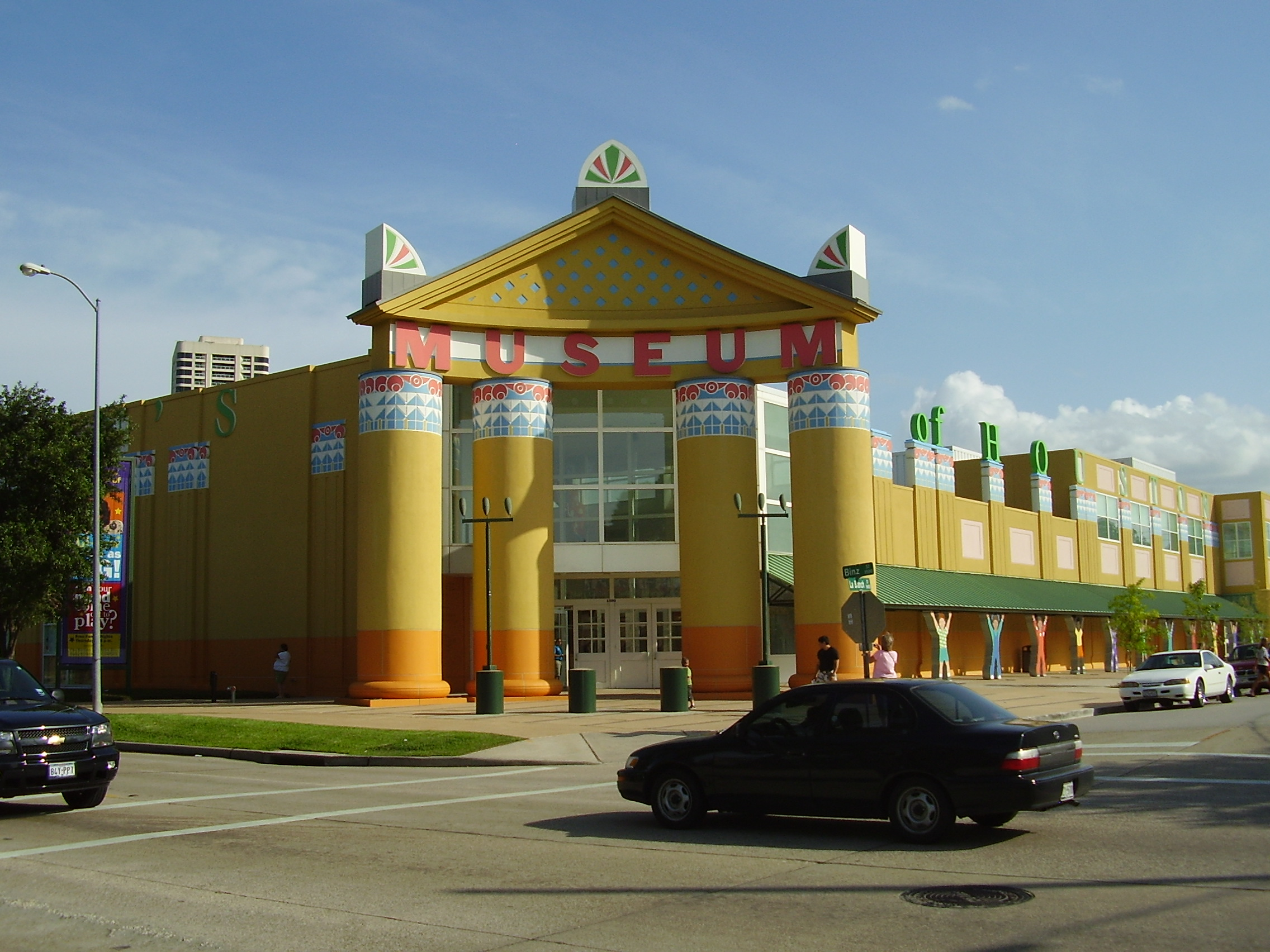
Children's Museum of Houston, Houston, US, by Robert Venturi, 1992

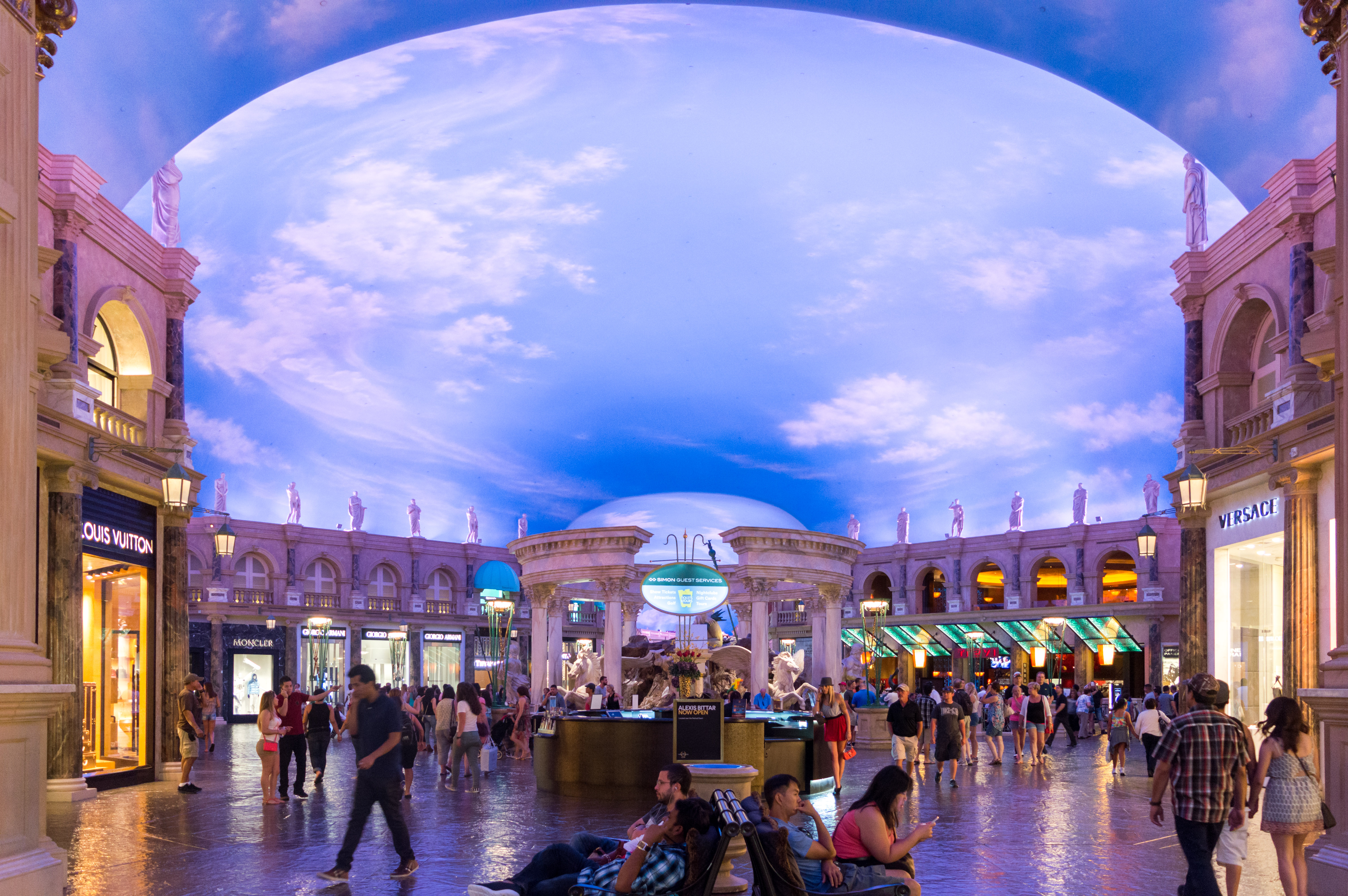
Forum Shops in Caesars Palace, Las Vegas, US, by Marnell Corrao Associates, 1992

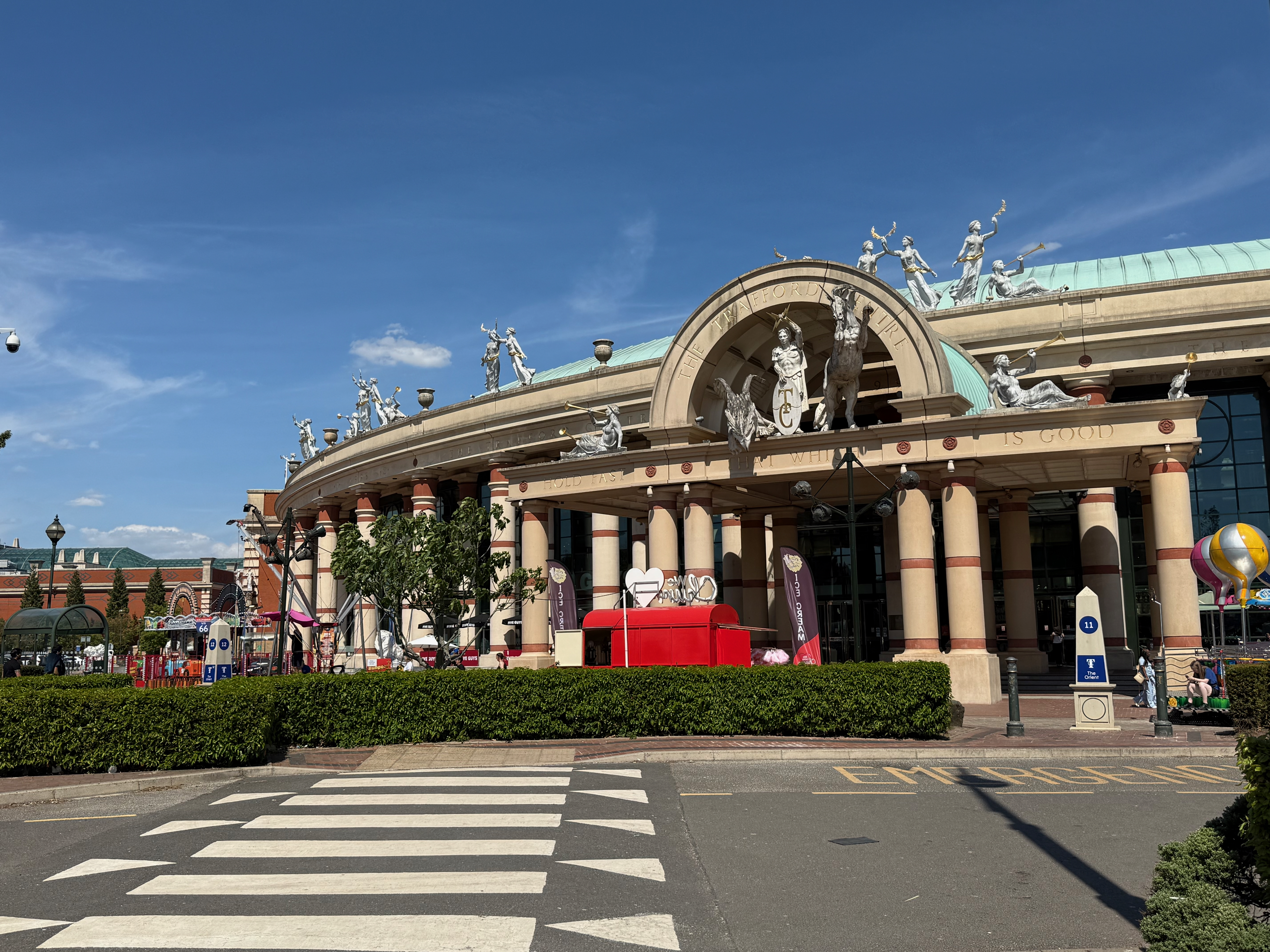
Exterior of the Trafford Centre, Manchester, UK, designed by Chapman Taylor and Leach Rhodes Walker, with sculptures by Colin Spofforth and Guy Portelli, 1998

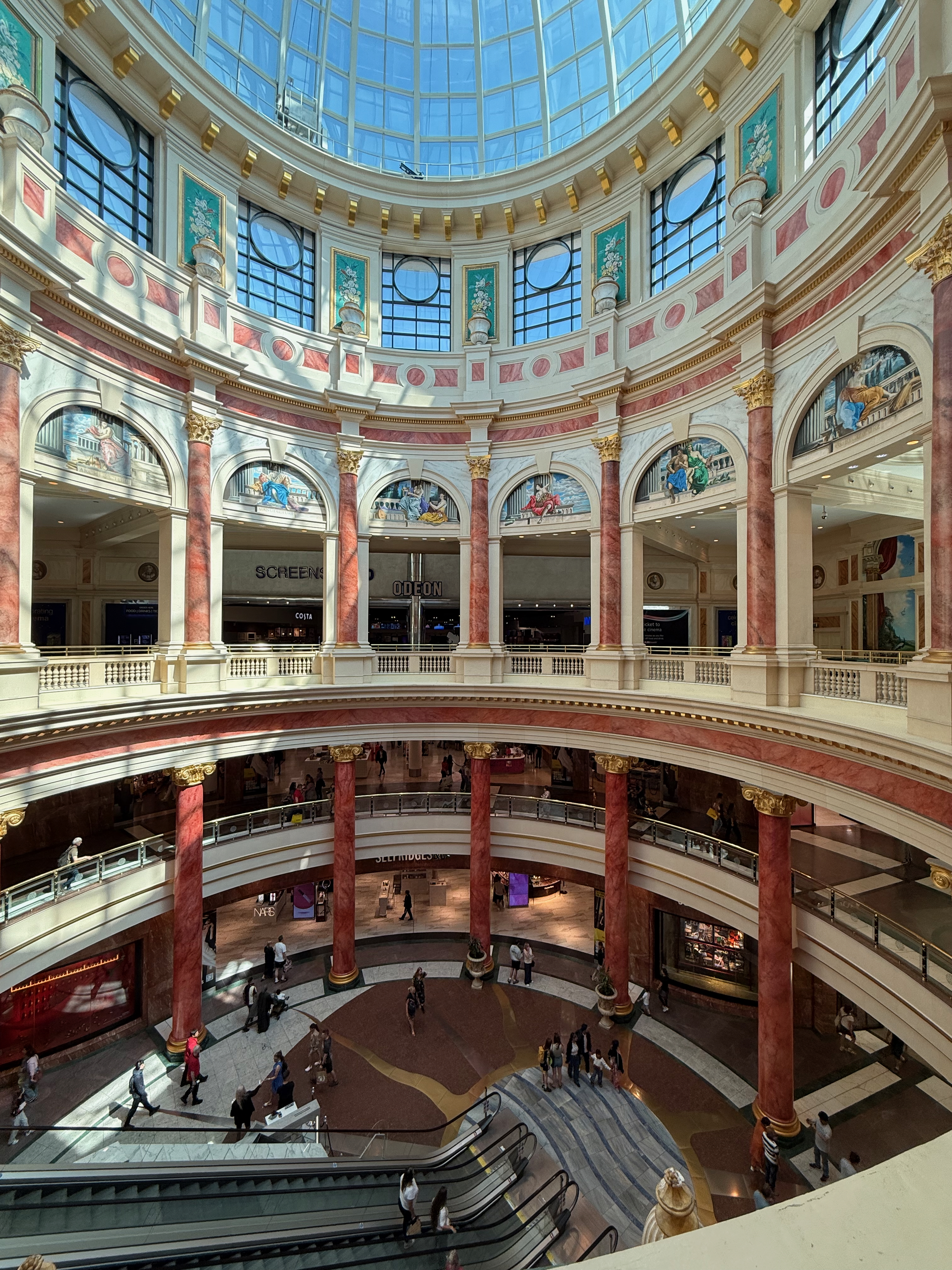
Interior of the Trafford Centre, by Chapman Taylor and Leach Rhodes Walker, 1998

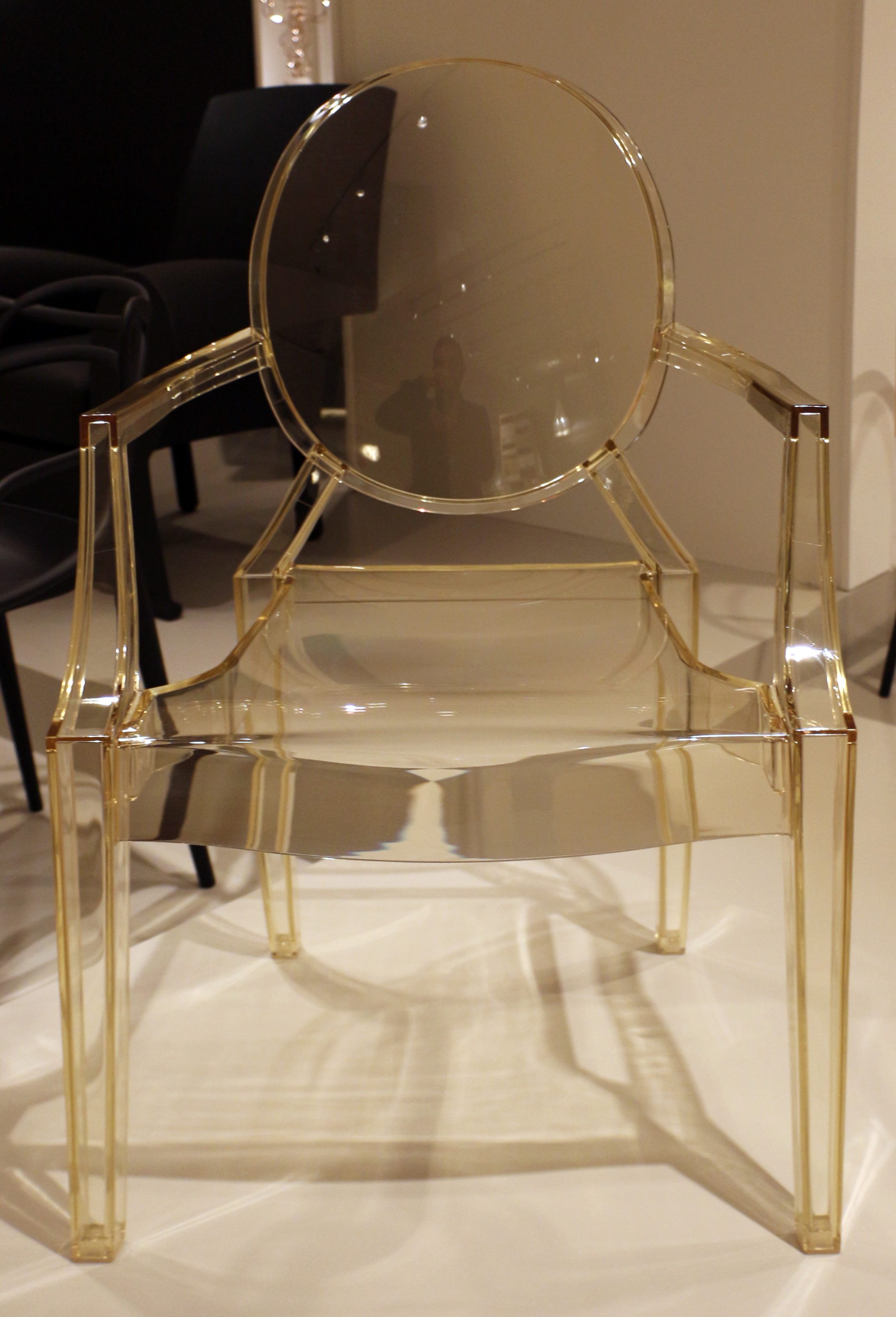
Louis Ghost, a simplified reinterpretation of armchairs in the Louis XVI style; by Philippe Starck; 2009; polycarbonate; height: 94 cm; various locations

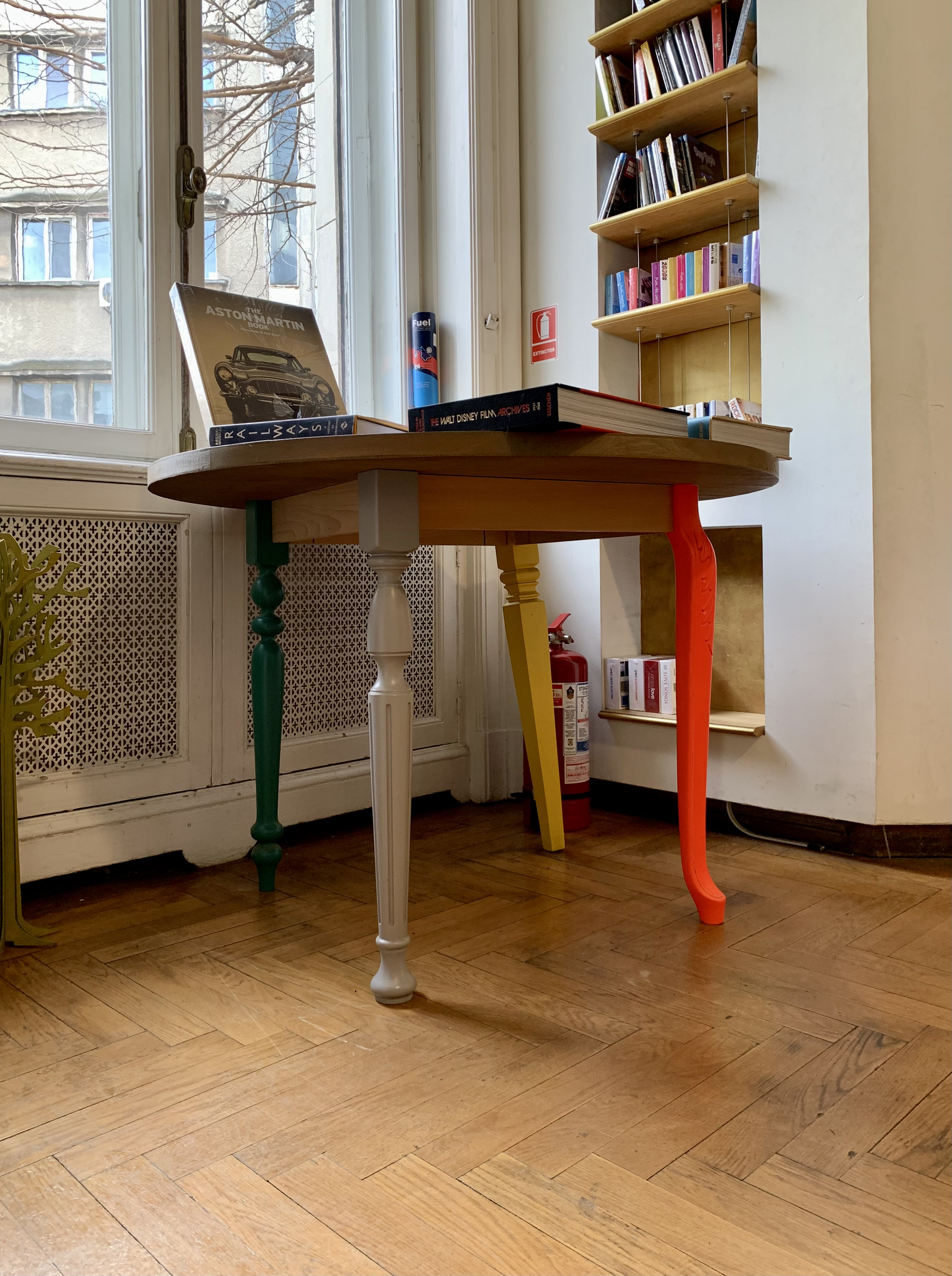
Postmodern table with different legs, some of which are reminiscent of Neoclassical furniture; unknown designer; c.2010; painted wood; unknown dimensions; Cărturești Verona (Strada Arthur Verona no. 15), Bucharest, Romania

An early text questioning Modernism was by architect Robert Venturi, Complexity and Contradiction in Architecture (1966), in which he recommended a revival of the 'presence of the past' in architectural design. He tried to include in his own buildings qualities that he described as 'inclusion, inconsistency, compromise, accommodation, adaptation, superadjacency, equivalence, multiple focus, juxtaposition, or good and bad space.' Robert Venturi's work reflected the broader counter-cultural mood of the 1960s which saw younger generations begin to question and challenge the political, social and racial realities with which they found themselves confronted. This rejection of Modernism is known as Postmodernism. Robert Venturi parodies Ludwig Mies van der Rohe's well-known maxim 'less is more' with 'less is a bore'. During the 1980s and 1990s, some Postmodern architects found a refuge in a sort of Neo-Neoclassicism. Their use of Classicism was not limited only to ornaments, using more or less proportions and other principles too. Post-Modern Classicism had been variously described by some people as 'camp' or 'kitsch'. An architect who has been remarked through Post-Modern Classicism is Ricardo Bofill. His work includes two housing projects of titanic scale near Paris, known as Les Arcades du Lac from 1975 to 1981, and Les Espaces d'Abraxas from 1978 to 1983. A building that stands out through its revivalism is the J. Paul Getty Museum, in Malibu, California, from 1970 to 1975, inspired by the ancient Roman Villa of the Papyri at Herculaneum. The J. Paul Getty Museum is far closer to 19th century Neoclassicism, like the Pompejanum in Aschaffenburg, Germany, than to Post-Modern Classicism of the 1980s.

=== Architecture in the 21st century ===
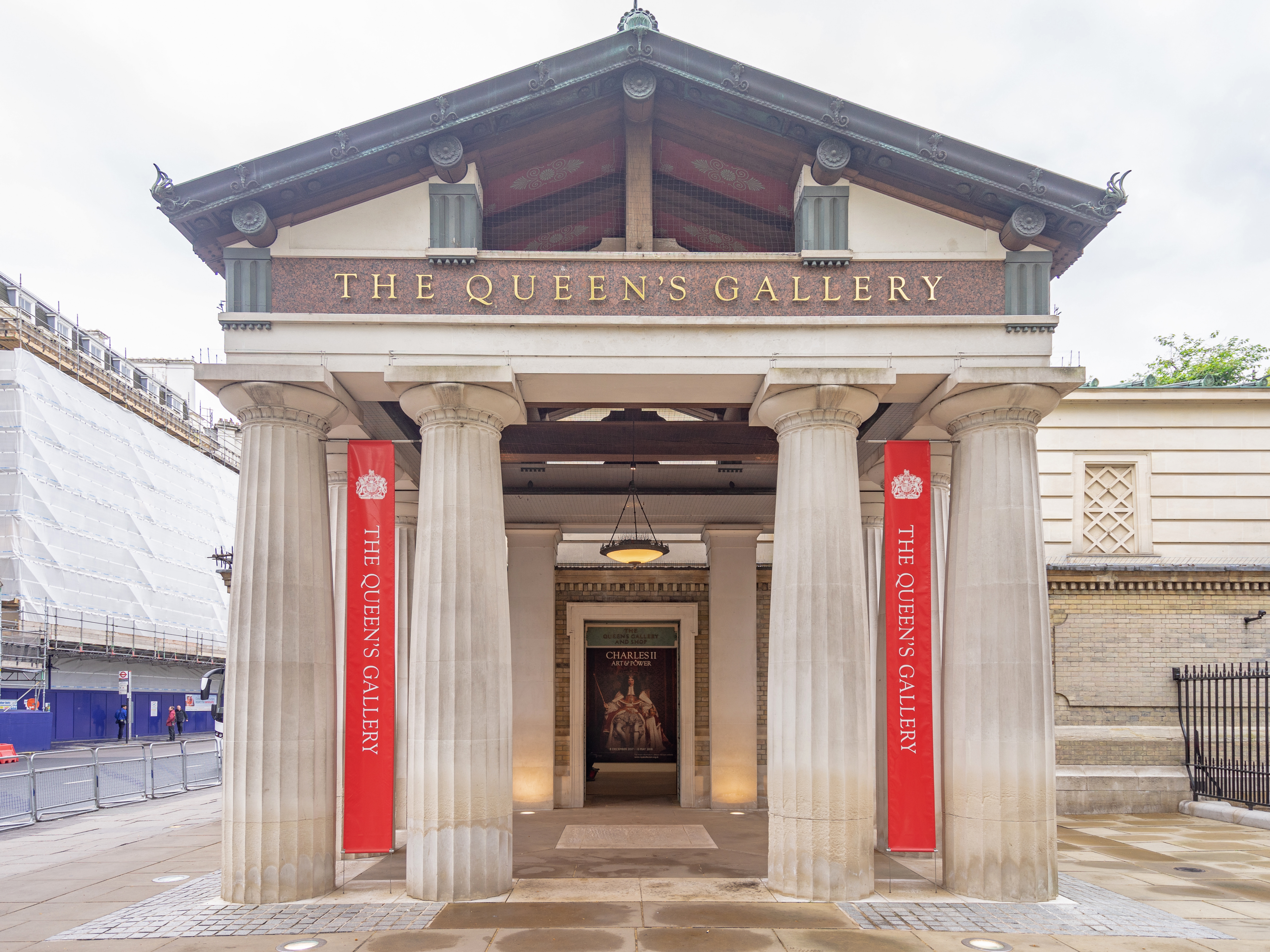
Queen's Gallery, Buckingham Palace, London, by John Simpson, 2000-2002

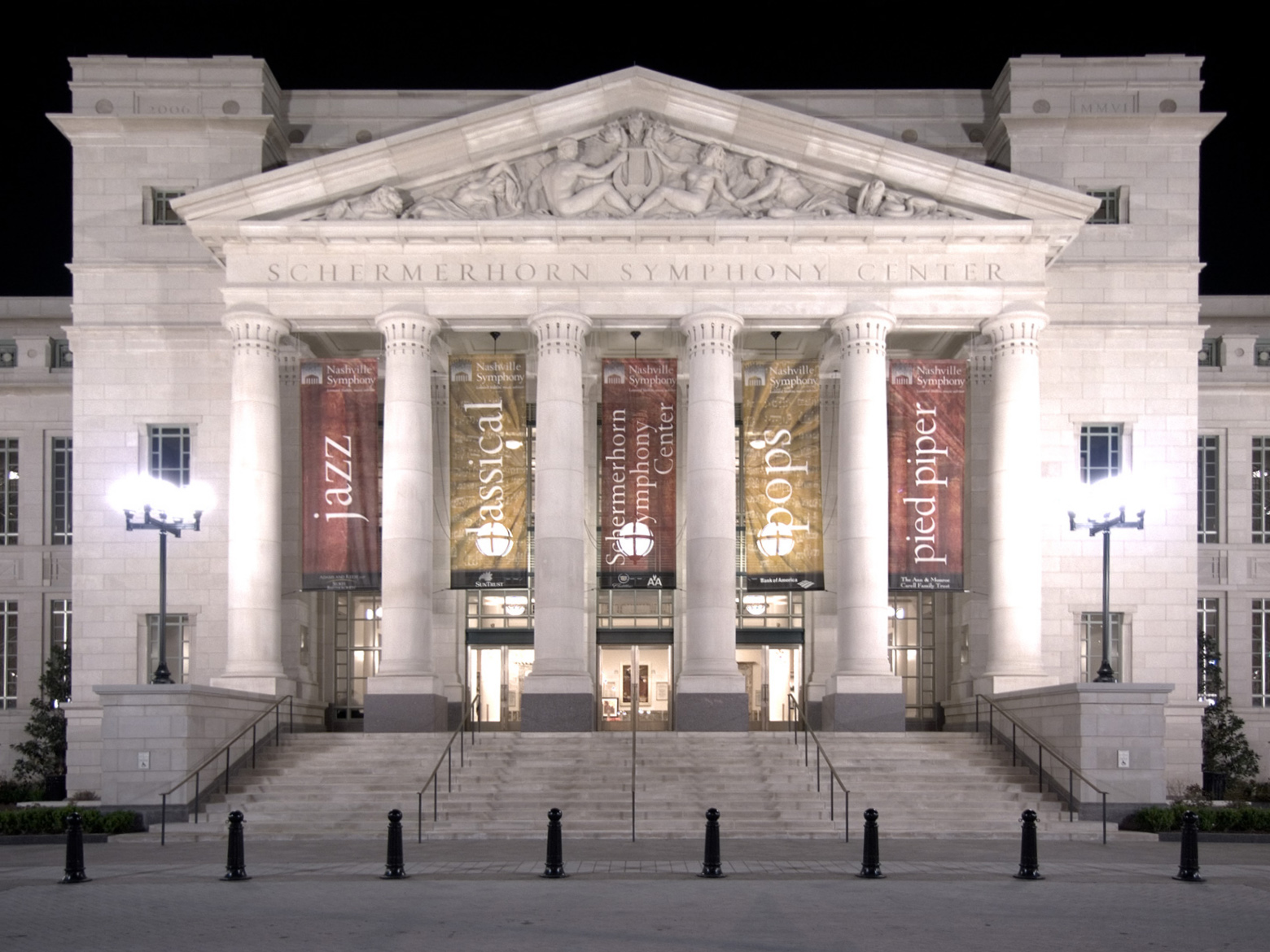
Schermerhorn Symphony Center, Nashville, Tennessee, US, by Earl Swensson Associates, David M. Schwarz Architects, and Hastings Architecture Associates, 2006

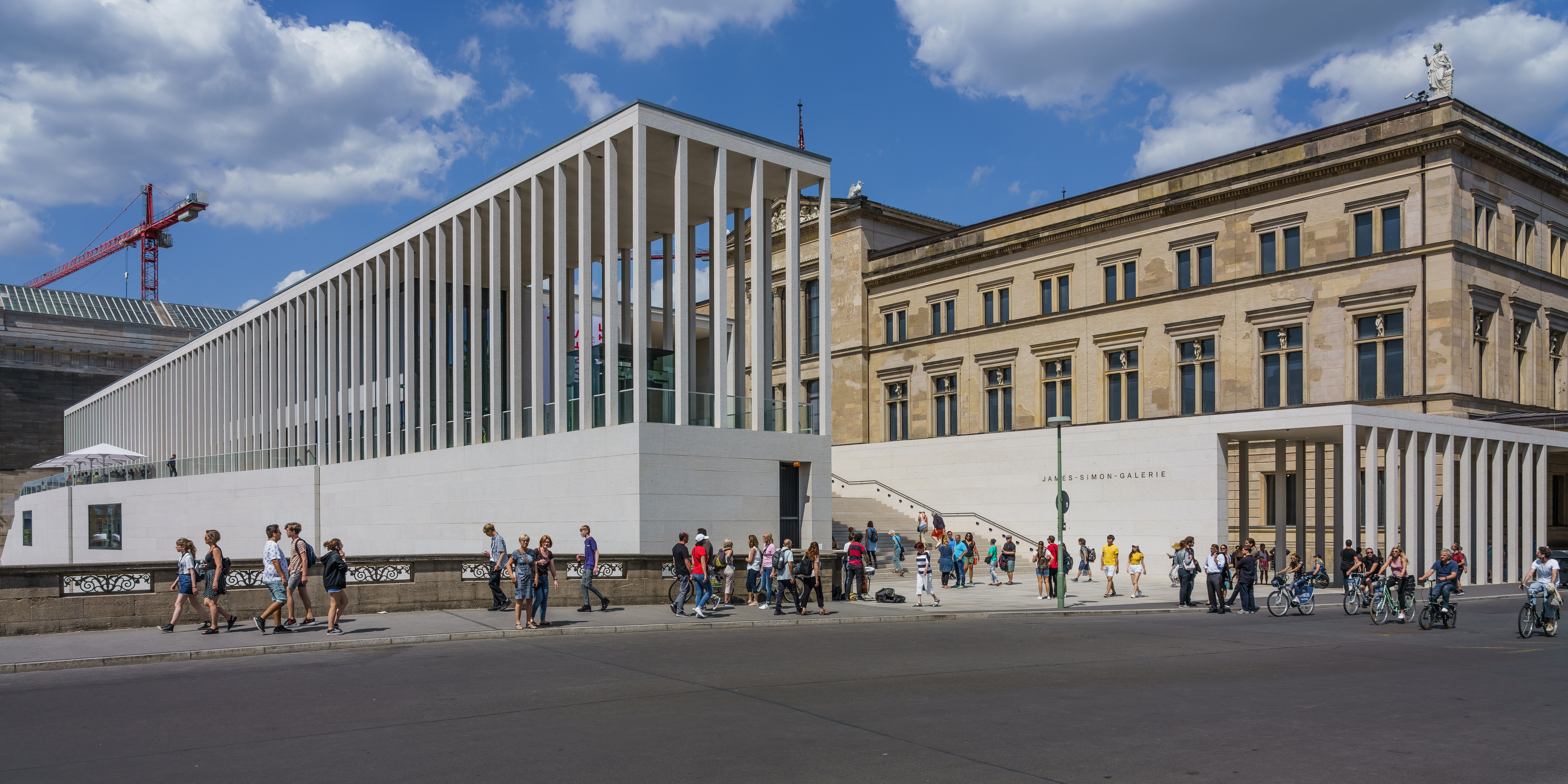
James Simon Gallery, entrance of the Neues Museum, Berlin, by David Chipperfield, 2009–2018

After a lull during the period of modern architectural dominance (roughly post-World War II until the mid-1980s), Neoclassicism has seen something of a resurgence.

As of the first decade of the 21st century, contemporary Neoclassical architecture is usually classed under the umbrella term of New Classical Architecture. Sometimes it is also referred to as Neo-Historicism or Traditionalism. Also, a number of pieces of postmodern architecture draw inspiration from and include explicit references to Neoclassicism, Antigone District and the National Theatre of Catalonia in Barcelona among them. Postmodern architecture occasionally includes historical elements, like columns, capitals or the tympanum.

For sincere traditional-style architecture that sticks to regional architecture, materials and craftsmanship, the term Traditional Architecture (or vernacular) is mostly used. The Driehaus Architecture Prize is awarded to major contributors in the field of 21st century traditional or classical architecture, and comes with a prize money twice as high as that of the modernist Pritzker Prize.

In the United States, various contemporary public buildings are built in Neoclassical style, with the 2006 Schermerhorn Symphony Center in Nashville being an example.

In Britain, a number of architects are active in the Neoclassical style. Examples of their work include two university libraries: Quinlan Terry's Maitland Robinson Library at Downing College and Robert Adam Architects' Sackler Library.

== See also ==
- 1795–1820 in Western fashion
- American Empire (style)
- Antiquization
- Nazi architecture
- Neoclassical architecture
- Neoclassicism in France
- Neo-Grec, the late Greek-Revival style
- Skopje 2014
